= Reflux (disambiguation) =

Reflux is a term meaning "to flow backwards" or "to return".

In chemistry, reflux is a distillation technique involving the condensation of vapors and the return of this condensate to the system from which it originated.

Reflux may also refer to:

- Duodenogastric reflux or biliary reflux
- Acid indigestion, cardialgia or pyrosis, all synonyms for heartburn
- Acid reflux disease, gastric reflux disease or gastro-oesophageal reflux disease (GORD), all synonyms for gastroesophageal reflux disease (GERD)
- Atypical reflux, extraesophageal reflux disease (EERD), supraesophageal reflux or supra-esophageal reflux, all synonyms for laryngopharyngeal reflux (LPR)
- Vesicoureteral reflux (VUR)
- Superficial venous reflux, see Chronic venous insufficiency
