= Puberphonia =

Regular use of a high-pitched voice after puberty

Puberphonia (also known as mutational falsetto, functional falsetto, incomplete mutation, adolescent falsetto, or pubescent falsetto) is a functional voice disorder that is characterized by the habitual use of a high-pitched voice after puberty, hence why many refer to the disorder as resulting in a 'falsetto' voice. The voice may also be heard as breathy, rough, and lacking in power. The onset of puberphonia usually occurs in adolescence, between the ages of 11 and 15 years, at the same time as changes related to puberty are occurring. This disorder usually occurs in the absence of other communication disorders.

There is a higher male prevalence of puberphonia, as the voice disorder is characterized by a high pitch that would be inappropriate for the age and sex of the patient. Typically, individuals with puberphonia do not present with underlying anatomical abnormalities. Instead, the disorder is usually psychogenic in nature, meaning resulting from psychological or emotional factors, and stems from inappropriate use of the voice mechanism. The habitual use of a high pitch while speaking is associated with tense muscles surrounding the vocal folds. Assessment and treatment of puberphonia is usually conducted by a speech-language pathologist (S-LP) or an otolaryngologist (ENT). Puberphonia is not a disorder that is likely to go away on its own. Without treatment, the changes in the patient's voice can become permanent. Treatment can involve direct voice therapy, indirect voice therapy, or audiovisual feedback.

== Signs and symptoms ==
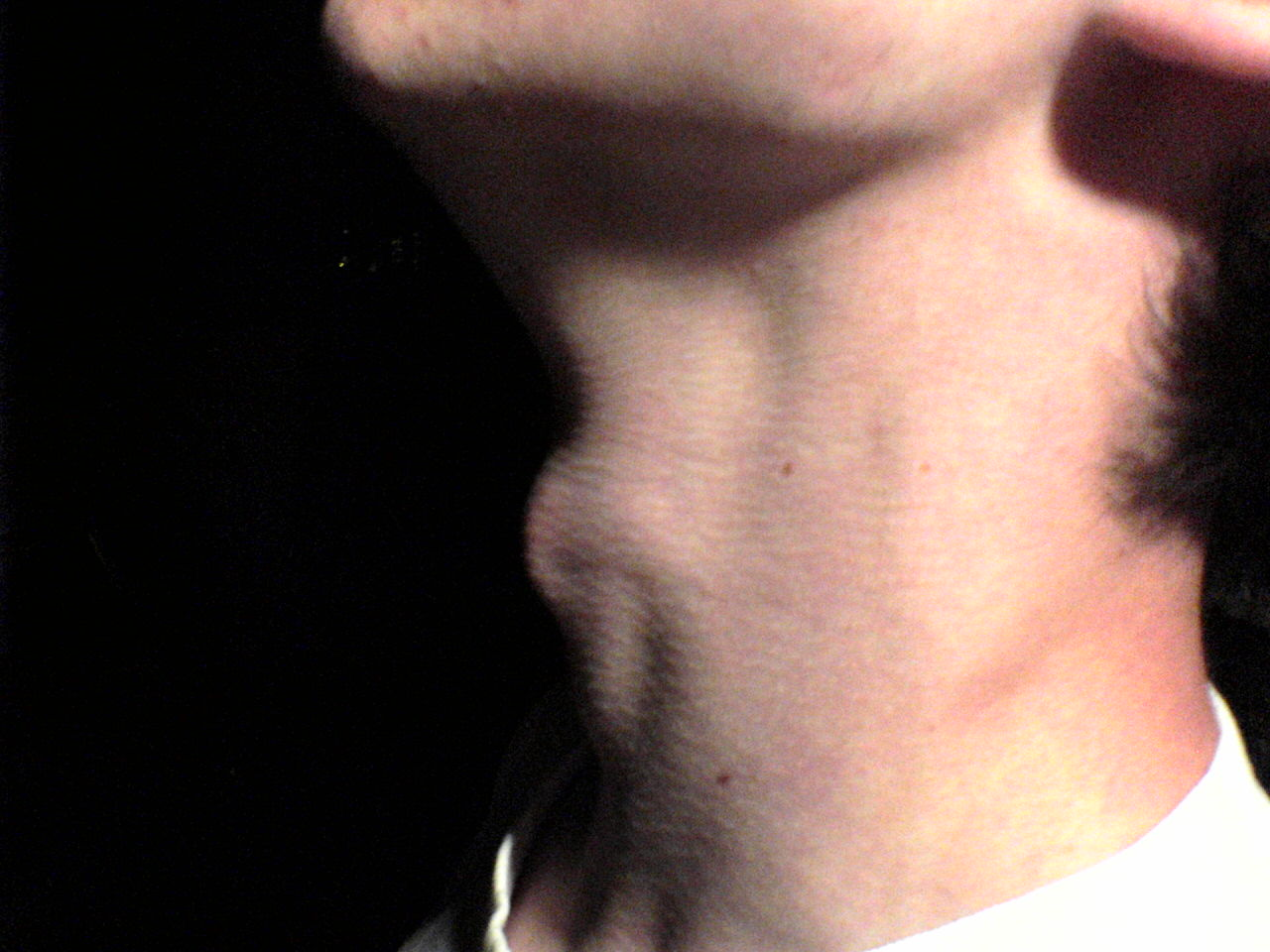
The laryngeal prominence, commonly known as the Adam's apple.

During puberty, changes in the larynx typically result in a decrease in pitch in both males and females. On average, the male voice deepens by one octave while the female voice lowers by a few semitones. The fundamental frequency (pitch) of an adult female typically falls between 165 and 255 Hz and an adult male between 85 and 180 Hz. Anatomical changes during puberty include enlargement of the larynx for both sexes. However, the larynx descends and grows significantly larger in males which often results in a visible laryngeal prominence on the neck (Adam's apple). Additionally, male vocal folds become longer and thicker and resonant cavities become larger. These changes contribute to a deepening of the voice characteristic of pubescent males.

Puberphonia is characterized by the failure to transition into the lower pitched voice of adulthood. In conjunction with an atypically high pitch, common symptoms include a weak, breathy, or hoarse voice, as well as a low vocal intensity, pitch breaks, and shallow breathing.

== Causes ==
There are a number of proposed causes for the development of puberphonia. The aetiology of puberphonia can be either organic (biological) or psychogenic (psychological) in nature. In males, however, organic causes are rare and psychogenic causes are more common.

Puberphonia is described as having three main variants, related to the level of anatomical change. The most common presentation of the condition is characterized by a normal adult larynx and an increased pitch due to the vocal folds adopting the falsetto position. A second variant can occur when the laryngeal development is prolonged during puberty. Lastly, puberphonia can occur due to an incomplete transformation of the larynx into the adult form.

=== Psychogenic causes ===
- Emotional stress
- Delayed development of secondary sex characteristics
- Possible gender dysphoria (described as a resistance to pubertal change in earlier literature)
- Self-consciousness resulting from an early breaking of the voice
- Self-consciousness resulting from emerging adulthood

=== Organic causes ===
- Laryngeal muscle tension which then causes laryngeal elevation
- Carcinoma glottitis
- Vocal Nodules
- Muscle incoordination
- Congenital anomalies of the larynx
- Vocal fold asymmetries
- Unilateral vocal fold paralysis
- Non-fusion of the thyroid laminae. When this is the case, it is important that hypogonadism is ruled out, as this may be the cause.

== Diagnosis ==
To determine whether a patient presents with puberphonia, a complete voice assessment including medical and diagnostic evaluations is recommended. These assessments are performed by otorhinolaryngologists and speech-language pathologists.

=== Patient profile ===
Puberphonia is most often diagnosed in adolescent or adult male patients. These patients often seek referral to a voice professional because of the social consequences of speaking in the falsetto register. Because a high-pitched voice is not pathologized in women, women are less likely to be referred to clinicians to treat falsetto speech. Some older adult women, however, may seek a referral for this disorder due to increasing weakness of their voice and vocal fatigue at the end of the day (these cases are often referred to as "juvenile voice" or "little girl's voice" rather than puberphonia).

=== Medical evaluation ===
Puberphonia is a functional voice disorder. To rule out problems in the structure of the larynx as the cause of their voice issues, patients are often referred to otorhinolaryngologists for a physical examination of the larynx and vocal folds. Once physical pathologies are ruled out, a behavioural evaluation can occur.

=== Behavioural evaluation ===
A behavioural assessment for puberphonia will consist of several types of tasks, and may include:

- Examining for tension in the neck and throat: The clinician will visually examine the area around the larynx to see if the voice box sits high in the throat, and palpate the area to determine whether there is excessive muscular tension.
- Determining the relationship between tension and vocal pitch: The clinician will ask the patient to perform warm-up and relaxation exercises such as those listed in the Treatment section below to determine whether the patient has access to their modal voice register.
- Establishing vocal range: The clinician will ask the patient to produce the lowest and highest pitch that they can, and perform different speaking or singing activities at various pitches.
- Listening for abnormal traits: The clinician will listen for the presence of breathy voice, an indication of speech in the falsetto register, and other distortions of vocal quality.
- Taking aerodynamic measurements: Many individuals with puberphonia may have limited breath support caused by the thoracic or shallow breathing patterns often used to support speech in the falsetto register. These symptoms are assessed using vocal tasks such as maximum phonation time and direct measures of breath support such as glottal airflow and subglottal pressure.

=== Other evaluations ===
Clinicians can also request a self-assessment, in which the patient describes their symptoms and their effects on activities of daily living. The clinician may direct this self-assessment to include the identification of personality traits that may maintain the disorder, the social and emotional consequences of the symptoms experienced, and whether the patient has any access to their modal voice register.

A complete assessment for puberphonia or any other voice disorder may require a referral to another healthcare professional, such as a psychologist or a surgeon, to determine candidacy for various treatment options.

== Treatment ==
=== Direct voice therapy ===
This condition is most often treated using voice therapy (vocal exercises) by speech-language pathologists (SLPs) or speech pathologists who have experience in treating voice disorders. The duration of treatment is commonly one to two weeks.

Techniques used include:

- Vocal exercises: Any vocal exercises should always be done under the supervision of speech language pathologists (SLPs) who are experts in treating voice disorders. Wrong methods of doing vocal exercises, or wrong specific vocal exercises, may damage the voice or vocal cords, sometimes permanently. Wrong vocal exercises are a kind of vocal abuse. Vocal abuse can result into vocal nodules, muscle tension dysphonia, vocal polyps, or a hoarse and breathy voice.
- Cough: The patient is asked to apply pressure on the Adam's apple and cough. This results in the shortening of the vocal folds which is the physiological mechanism that reduces pitch. The patient can thus practice voicing at a lower pitch.
- Speech range masking: This procedure is based on the theory that when speaking in noisy backgrounds, people speak louder and more clearly in order to be heard. The patient practices speaking while a masking noise is playing. Then, the patient listens to a recording of their voice during the masking session and tries to match it without the masking. By doing this, the patient practices their 'loud and clear' voice.
- Glottal attack before a vowel: A glottal attack is when the vocal folds are fully closed and then pushed open by the air pressure from breathing out or making a sound. In this technique, the patient breathes in and then makes a vowel as they breathe out.
- Effortful closure techniques: this procedure is based on pushing, pulling, or isometric exercises to forcefully close the glottis, while the patient phonates, which effectually lowers the pitch due to the lowering of the larynx. The targeted sounds or words can then be shaped from the phonation produced during the exercises. In pushing exercises, the patient pushes against a structure (e.g., a wall) or object; in pulling exercises the patient pulls an object (e.g., a chair they are sitting on); in isometric exercises the patient holds a position (e.g., pushing hands together). Additionally, effortful closure techniques can be achieved through holding one's breath or grunting.
- Laryngeal musculature relaxation techniques: Laryngeal muscles surround the vocal folds and by relaxing them, there is reduced pressure on the vocal folds. This can be done by yawning and subsequently sighing, exaggerated chewing while speaking, and speaking or singing the 'm' sound.
- Lowering of larynx to appropriate position: The larynx is lowered by the patient by putting pressure on the Adam's apple. By lowering the larynx, the vocal folds relax, and thus pitch is lowered. The patient does this while speaking to practice speaking with a lower pitch.
- Humming while sliding down the scale: The patient starts humming at the highest pitch that they can reach and then keeps lowering the pitch while humming. This allows the patient to practice using a lower pitch and also to relax the laryngeal muscles.
- Half swallow boom technique: The patient says 'boom' just after swallowing. This is repeated with the patient turning their head to either side and also while lowering the chin. After practice, the patient adds more words. This technique helps to close the vocal folds completely.

=== Indirect voice therapy ===
Indirect treatment options for puberphonia focus on creating an environment where direct treatment options will be more effective. Counselling, performed by the SLP, a psychologist, or counsellor, can help patients identify the psychological factors that contribute to their disorder and give them tools to address those factors directly. Patients may also be educated about good vocal hygiene and how their behaviour could have long term effects on their voice.

=== Audiovisual feedback ===
In puberphonia, the use of audiovisual feedback allows the patient to observe graphic and numerical representations of their voice and pitch. This allows the patient to determine an ideal pitch range based on normative data on age and gender, and incrementally work through speech tasks while working in that desired pitch range. As the patient improves, speech tasks progress to become more natural, involving tasks such as reciting automatic information, to reading, to spontaneous speech and conversation. Incorporating audiovisual feedback in speech and voice therapies has been successful in intervention by improving motivation and guidance.

=== Surgery ===
In some cases when traditional voice therapy is ineffective, surgical interventions are considered. This can occur in situations where intervention is delayed or the patient is in denial, causing the condition to become resistant to voice therapy.

There are different types of surgical interventions which have been successful in lowering the vocal pitch in men with puberphonia who had previously received ineffective voice and psychotherapy. The first surgical intervention developed, called relaxation thyroplasty or tetrusion thyroplasty, involves a bilateral excision of 2 to 3 mm vertical strips of thyroid cartilage which lowers the vocal pitch through anteroposterior relaxation and shortening of the vocal folds. It can be performed under local or general anaesthesia.

Relaxation thyroplasty by a medial approach is a modified approach of traditional relaxation thyroplasty. This version involves lowering the vocal pitch by creating an incision bilaterally in the thyroid lamina and then depressing the anterior segment of the thyroid cartilage.

A more recent, less invasive intervention is the window relaxation thyroplasty. This approach involves creating a window at the anterior commissure, which is then displaced posteriorly.

== Epidemiology ==
The incidence of puberphonia is estimated to be about 1 in 900,000 population.The incidence of puberphonia is thought to be higher in patients with autism and/or (unrecognised) gender dysphoria.

The incidence is also thought to be higher in males; however, this is likely due to cultural and psychosocial factors affecting patient presentation and diagnosis, with the contrast between actual pitch and expected pitch higher in males with puberphonia. However, it has also been suggested that the greater contrast between actual pitch and expected pitch leads to an increased risk for males to develop the condition.
