= Jan G. Švec =

Jan Švec (born 22 November 1966) is a Czech voice scientist. He is the inventor of videokymography, a method for high-speed visualization of vocal-fold vibrations, which is being used for advanced diagnosis of voice disorders.

As of 2011, Jan G. Švec has written over 140 publications (over 40 as first author) in various areas of voice research: visualization of vocal fold vibration through videokymography; voice registers; singing voice; methodology of voice measurement; voice dosimetry; determination of biomechanical properties of vocal folds; vocal fold and vocal tract modelling; clinical measurement of voice; and scientometry.

Jan G. Švec was born 22.11.1966 in Olomouc, Czech Republic. He received his MSc (1990: Palacký University, Olomouc) in fine mechanics and optics, and two PhD degrees in biophysics (1996: Palacký University, Olomouc) and medical sciences (2000: University of Groningen). From 1995 to 1999, he worked as assistant professor at the Institute for Postgraduate Medical Education, Prague, Czech Republic. In 2001–2004 he was a Visiting Research Professor at the National Center for Voice and Speech, Denver Center for the Performing Arts, Denver, CO, USA and in 2004–2007 a research scientist at the Groningen Voice Research Lab, Department of Biomedical Engineering, University of Groningen, the Netherlands. Since 2007, he has been a scientist and lecturer at the Department of Biophysics, Palacký University, Olomouc, Czech Republic and also a research scientist at the Voice Centre Prague.

In 2004–2010 he was the chair of the Voice Committee of the International Association of Logopedics and Phoniatrics (IALP). He serves as the deputy editor-in-chief for Logopedics Phoniatrics Vocology, Taylor & Francis, and is a member of the editorial board of the Journal of Voice, Elsevier Medical Journals. He is a Distinguished Alumnus of the Palacký University in Olomouc, the Czech Republic.
