= Bonnie Petrie =

American broadcast journalist and podcaster

Bonnie Petrie is an American broadcast journalist and podcast host specializing in health and science reporting. She serves as bioscience and medicine reporter at Texas Public Radio and host of the podcast Petrie Dish.

Petrie held news anchor positions at several major market radio stations, including WGY in Albany, KRLD-AM in Dallas, and News 92 FM in Houston. During this period, she created and hosted Pea in the Podcast, a pregnancy‑focused series featuring interviews with medical professionals and authors. The podcast was listed among recommended pregnancy podcasts by SheKnows.

In July 2015, Petrie joined WTMJ in Milwaukee as co-anchor of Wisconsin's Morning News. Shortly after beginning the role, her voice began to deteriorate and she was diagnosed with spasmodic dysphonia, a neurological disorder affecting the larynx, leading her to leave the position later that year.

Petrie later joined Texas Public Radio in San Antonio as its bioscience and medicine reporter. She hosts Petrie Dish, a podcast that launched in March 2020 to cover the COVID-19 pandemic before broadening to health and science topics more generally. It is distributed through the NPR network. An episode covering the outbreak in the Rio Grande Valley received second place in the public health category of the Association of Health Care Journalists' 2020 Awards for Excellence in Health Care Journalism. The podcast has received Gracie Awards from the Alliance for Women in Media, including a 2021 award in the Radio Non-Commercial Local Host/Anchor category.

Petrie was selected for the Blue Cross Blue Shield of Massachusetts Foundation's Health Coverage Fellowship in 2019. In 2023, she was selected for the National Press Foundation's Future of the American Child Fellowship and the Association of Health Care Journalists–CDC Health Journalism Fellowship in Atlanta. She was nominated for the Texas Radio Hall of Fame in 2017. Petrie received first-place Anson Jones MD Awards from the Texas Medical Association for short radio reporting and online media in 2021 and first-place awards from the Texas Associated Press Broadcasters for news anchoring in 2013 and feature reporting in 2014.
