= Depth kymography =

Depth-kymography is the 3D display of the human vocal fold vibrations by measuring their vertical and horizontal movements simultaneously, using a specially designed 3D endoscope. The method and term "depth-kymography" were introduced by Nibu A George, Frits de Mul and Harm Schutte from the University Medical Center Groningen, The Netherlands in 2007.

Human vocal folds vibrate in a very complex manner. During phonation vocal folds move in both horizontal and vertical directions. The imaging of vocal fold vibrations is achieved by inserting an endoscope through the mouth. The vocal folds are viewed from the top. Hence, with a normal endoscope, only the horizontal movements of the vocal folds are visible. Endoscopes used for the visualization of larynxes are commonly known as laryngoscopes. With a specially designed 3D laryngoscope, movement of the vocal folds in the horizontal and the vertical directions can be simultaneously measured and displayed with horizontal and vertical displacements, forming the two orthogonal planes with time as the third dimension. Using this method, researchers were also able to measure the mucosal wave propagation. Depth-kymography has potential in the investigation of voice disorders and in phonosurgical applications. It advances the techniques of videokymography.

== See also ==
- Kymograph
