= Jeff Pegues =

American journalist (born 1970)

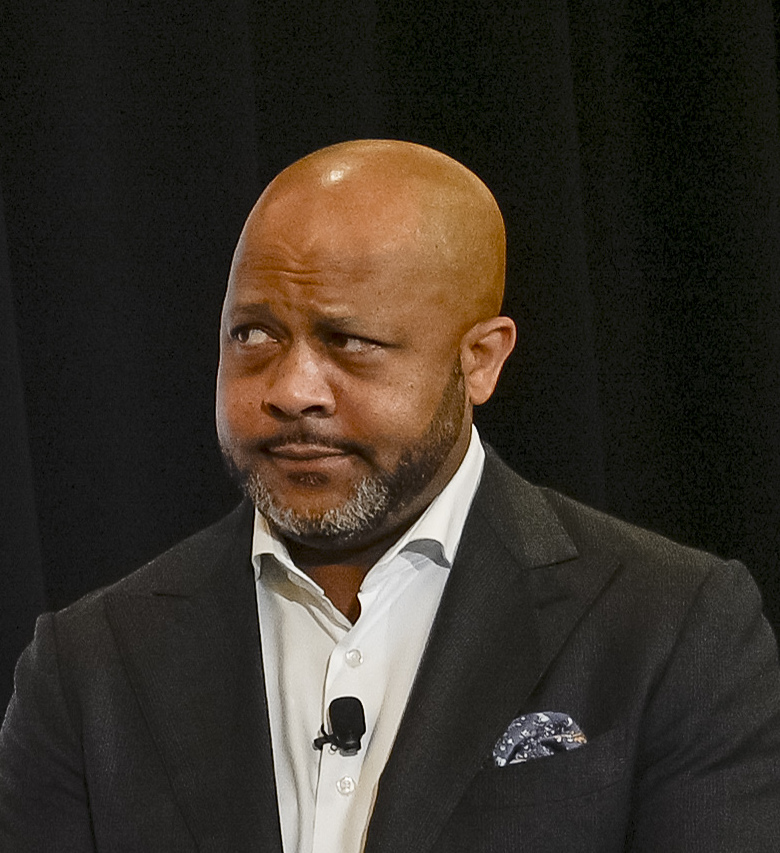
- Pegues in 2023
- Born: Jeffrey Darden Pegues; March 4, 1970 (age 56); Washington, D.C., U.S.
- Education: Miami University (BA)
- Occupations: Journalist, reporter
- Years active: 1990s–present
- Employer(s): WABC-TV (2003–2013); CBS News (2013–2024)
- Notable work: CEO, Jeff Pegues Media
- Spouse: Tareaz Pegues (m. 1995–2006)
- Website: jeffpeguesmedia.com

Jeffrey Darden Pegues (born March 4, 1970) is a journalist, author and former CBS News correspondent and former host of the CBS News Podcast America Changed Forever.

Pegues was named Chief National Affairs and Justice Correspondent in December 2021. He was named a Correspondent for CBS News on May 29, 2013. Four months into his tenure, he became CBS News' Transportation Correspondent. In late 2014, he was promoted to CBS News Justice and Homeland Security Correspondent, one of the most challenging and high-profile beats in network news. In May 2019, Pegues was the commencement speaker and is currently a member of the board of trustees at his alma mater, Miami University

Prior to joining CBS News, Pegues was a reporter for WABC-TV in New York City. He received numerous Emmy Awards during his nearly ten-year run (2003-2013) at WABC-TV. Pegues is credited with bringing the story of David Goldman and his international fight for his son into the headlines. Pegues has also been recognized for his outstanding reporting at the height of Superstorm Sandy. As the storm crashed into New York City he reported on the rising flood water and spreading fires in Queens. In 2005, he reported on Hurricane Rita from Texas.

Prior to WABC-TV, Pegues was a reporter for WBAL-TV in Baltimore, Maryland, where he earned Emmy Award nominations. At WSVN-TV, the Fox affiliate in Miami, Florida, he worked as an evening anchor. At the time, it was the top-rated evening newscast in that market. In 2004, Pegues covered both the Democratic National Convention and the Republican National Convention.

On Tuesday, February 13, 2024 Pegues was laid off from CBS News after layoffs were announced by Paramount Global.

== Early life ==
Born in 1970 in Washington D.C., Pegues spent part of his childhood in Westport, Connecticut.

== Personal life ==
Pegues, who is divorced, currently resides in Washington, D.C. He is a graduate of Boston University in Boston, Massachusetts. He was a starting wide receiver, and earlier in his career, a back-up to Canadian Football League legend Milt Stegall. He was crowned Homecoming King in his senior year of high school.

Pegues lives with spasmodic dysphonia, a neurological condition that causes his voice to sound strained.

== Awards ==
Pegues is the recipient of three Emmy Awards. In 2013, he received the Sigma Delta Chi Award from the Society of Professional Journalists (SPJ) for excellence in journalism. He received an honorary Doctor of Letters degree from Miami University in May 2019.

== Books ==
His first book, Black and Blue: Inside the Divide between the Police and Black America, explores the longstanding rift between local law enforcement and people of color. Black and Blue was published in May 2017 by Prometheus Books. Pegues' second book is about the Russian hacking of the 2016 election. Kompromat: How Russia Undermined American Democracy was published by Prometheus Books in July 2018.
