= Videokymography =

High-speed medical imaging method

- Purpose: visualize the human vocal fold vibration

Videokymography is a high-speed medical imaging method to visualize the human vocal fold vibration dynamics. It was invented by Jan G. Švec under the guidance of Harm K. Schutte.

A digital technique for high-speed visualization of vibration, called videokymography, was developed and applied to the vocal folds. The system uses a modified video camera able to work in two modes: high-speed (nearly 8,000 images/s) and standard (50 images/s in CCIR norm). In the high-speed mode, the camera selects one active horizontal line (transverse to the glottis) from the whole laryngeal image. The successive line images were presented in real time on a commercial TV monitor, filling each video frame from top to bottom. The system makes it possible to observe left-right asymmetries, open quotient, propagation of mucosal waves, movement of the upper and, in the closing phase, the lower margins of the vocal folds, etc. The technique is suitable for further processing and quantification of recorded vibration.

== History ==
Videokymography was developed in 1994 by Czech and Dutch scientists, Jan G. Švec and Harm K. Schutte, in collaboration with the Lambert Instruments company, as a low-cost, high-speed imaging method for examination of vocal fold vibrations. After being developed in the Netherlands, in 1996 it was introduced to clinical practice in Prague by a Czech laryngologist and phoniatrician František Šram in collaboration with J.G. Švec. In 1997, the three founders of videokymography, Švec, Schutte and Šram, made an award-winning scientific video "Introduction to Videokymography" for the World ORL Congress in Sydney. A second generation videokymography camera was developed in the Netherlands in 2006 by Q. Qiu, again under the guidance of H. K. Schutte. Subsequently Q. Qiu and colleagues founded the company Cymo, B.V. producing the videokymography camera along with other medical imaging products and became its director. Videokymography complements another visualization method known as videostroboscopy for early diagnostics of voice disorders and therapy evaluation. It has spread as a clinical and research tool to clinics around the world, and kymographic display was adopted also for digital high-speed videoendoscopy.

== Details ==
Accompanied by breath under lung pressure, the glottis and vocal folds move in an open-close motion. During the opening and closing, the process by which the vocal folds meet is referred to as phonation (non-technically called vocalization), which is the general function of how vocal sound is produced. During phonation, vibratory cycles occur all too quickly for the unaided eye to observe. Therefore, if there lies a problem within someone's phonation cycle, it cannot be examined or diagnosed without the aid of technology like videostroboscopy or videokymography. The imaging of vocal fold vibrations is done by inserting an endoscope through the mouth in order to view the vocal folds from the top.

== Advantage of Videokymography ==
The process of videokymography offers a particular advantage over methods like videostroboscopy. The process of videostroboscopy has been reported as successful in accuracy, revision, and treatment of diagnoses while its limitations have also been mentioned to involve its reliability on synchronization and inability to produce concrete vibratory cycles. Therefore, examinations of irregular vibratory patterns that may be caused by a vocal disorder are not feasible by videostroboscopy. In this area of examination, videokymography offers an advantage due to its ability to produce vibratory cycles through the use of its high-speed imaging. This makes it an ideal complementary method to videostroboscopy for a patient interested in vocal fold examination or diagnoses.

== Future ==
In recent years, there have been studies and experiments conducted to create a new form of visualization developed from videokymography known as depth kymography. Among the scientists whom have implemented these experiments, Dr. Harm Schutte, the Dutch scientist who co-developed videokymography is one of them. Whereas videokymography is a two-dimensional visualization of vocal-fold movement produced by an endoscope that registers only horizontal vocal-fold movement, depth kymography is a three-dimensional visualization produced by a specially designed 3D endoscope that registers movement of the vocal folds in the horizontal and the vertical directions with time being the third dimension. This brings direction and focus to the development of another detailed and analytical form of vocal fold visualization that is potentially an evolution of videokymography.

== See also ==
- Kymograph
