= Muscle tension dysphonia =

Muscle Tension Dysphonia
- Specialty: Otolaryngology, Speech Language Pathology
- Symptoms: changes in voice, hoarse voice, breathy voice
- Usual onset: Middle age

Muscle tension dysphonia (MTD) was originally coined in 1983 by Morrison and describes a dysphonia caused by increased muscle tension of the muscles surrounding the voice box: the laryngeal and paralaryngeal muscles. MTD is a unifying diagnosis for a previously poorly categorized disease process. It allows for the diagnosis of dysphonia caused by many different etiologies and can be confirmed by history, physical exam, laryngoscopy and videostroboscopy, a technique that allows for the direct visualization of the larynx, vocal cords, and vocal cord motion.

MTD has been known by other names including muscle misuse dysphonia, hyperfunctional dysphonia, and hyperkinetic dysphonia among others. MTD can be broken in two groups: primary and secondary. Primary MTD occurs without an underlying organic cause while secondary MTD occurs due to an underlying organic source.

MTD is more commonly diagnosed in women, the middle aged, and individuals who have high levels of stress. It is also more often seen in those who use their voice often such as singers and teachers.

== Etiology ==
=== Pathophysiology ===
The pathophysiology of MTD is multifactorial. Voice production requires the coordination of multiple muscles and other structures in the larynx. Multiple factors cause the muscles of the larynx to become tense. This changes the position of the larynx and affects the cartilaginous structures within the larynx leading to abnormal phonation. There is increased muscle activity in MTD due to personal temperament, increased vocal use, and underlying medical or physical causes.

==== Primary MTD ====
Primary MTD has no underlying medical or physical cause and no known psychogenic or neurologic cause. It is caused by increased tension of the laryngeal muscles secondary to personality traits such as anxiety or life factors such as increased stress. Individual with high vocal use like teachers, singers, and others professions with high vocal expectations can also develop MTD. Additionally incorrect use of the voice can cause increased tension and lead to MTD. Primary MTD makes up a significant proportion (as high as 40%) of patients seen for voice complaints.

==== Secondary MTD ====
Secondary MTD is caused by an underlying medical or physical reason. Vocal fold lesions such as a vocal fold nodule or other changes in the vocal fold mucosa can lead to increased tension in the larynx and cause dysphonia. Larynogopharyngeal reflux, a process that is similar to GERD, can bring stomach acid into the larynx. This can provoke the larynx to tense to prevent the aspiration of the acid. It also has been found that MTD can occur in postmenopausal women due to decreased hormone levels which lead to swelling of the laryngeal tissues and eventual atrophy. Older men can also develop MTD as their vocal cords thin as they age. Post infectious MTD is also possible. For example during an episode of laryngitis, the muscles of the larynx tense secondary to the inflammation and residual tension can remain following the resolution of the illness.

== Signs and symptoms ==
The voice quality in MTD can be described as breathy and can also sound harsh. Patients may complain that their voice sounds abnormal as well as needing to strain to produce sound, and having increased dysphonia with increased vocalization.

== Diagnosis ==
A multidisciplinary team including otolaryngologists and speech language pathologists is useful for the evaluation and diagnosis of MTD. It is important to consider other dysphonias in the differential diagnosis.

=== Physical exam ===
Palpation is a key exam maneuver when evaluating MTD. Because of the increased muscle tension of the paralaryngeal and laryngeal muscles, the larynx will be elevated on palpation. To make the exam more objective, various scales have developed to help standardize the process.

=== Voice quality ===
The voice in MTD has been described as hoarse and breathy. MTD can be distinguished for another similar dysphonia, adductor spasmodic dysphonia, by differences in voice characteristics. In MTD, all vocal tasks (vowels, singing, etc) are difficult for the patient while in adductor spasmodic dysphonia, some vocal tasks are difficult while others are unaffected. There are objective parameters that help characterize the degree of dysphonia such as the Dysphonia Severity Index (DSI). This index is made up of many measurements of the voice include voice frequency measurements (high and low), maximum phonation time (MPT), and jitter (frequency instability).

=== Vocal fold visualization ===
Videostroboscopy is the use of a camera to see the larynx and vocal cords. Stroboscopy allows the visualization of vocal cord movement, which vibrate too quickly for human eye to perceive. When assessing the vocal cords, the most common finding in MTD is a posterior glottic gap. Other findings include increased movement of the vocal folds towards one another, and changes in the angles of the vocal fold openings.

==== Other diagnosis modalities ====
Surface electromyography (sEMG) has been considered as a diagnosis tool for MTD. sEMG can measure the muscle units of the muscles of the larynx to deduce if there is increased activity which means they are more tense. The results of studies using sEMG in MTD is currently mixed. Some studies demonstrate increased EMG levels in MTD while others do not demonstrate a difference in EMG between individuals with MTD and individuals without MTD.

Aerodynamic measurements can be used to evaluate the behavior of air during phonation. Subglottal pressure (SgP), mean transglottal flow (GF), and laryngeal resistance are the main measurements used. One study found that increased SgP with normal or increased GF is the most common set of measurements for patients with MTD. Another study found that it is possible to objectively diagnose up to 92.5% of patients with MTD using SgP.

== Treatment ==
=== Medical treatment ===
In secondary MTD, the underlying medical cause should be addressed. Residual infections should be treated. Laryngopharyngeal reflux is treated similarly to GERD with diet and lifestyle adjustments and consideration for a proton pump inhibitor.

=== Voice therapy ===
Voice therapy is commonly used in the treatment of MTD. The goal of voice therapy is to encourage proper vocal use and decrease the tension of the laryngeal muscles. Examples of voice therapy include voice exercises to help increase glottic closure, vocal hygiene, manual laryngeal therapy, respiratory exercises, nasal exercises and frequency modulation amongst other techniques.

=== Manual therapy ===
Manual therapies include the physical manipulation of the larynx, hyoid bone, thyroid cartilage, neck (sternocleidomastoid) muscles, and cricothyroid visor. The various applications of pressure, rotational massage, circular compression, kneading, and stretching increase range of motion and muscle efficiency while decreasing stiffness, tenderness, muscle tension, and muscle contraction. The larynx is lowered and moved side to side in manual circumlaryngeal therapy (MCT). The patient is able to track changes in vocal quality by humming or vocalizing during the process.

Patients with MTD have shown long term improvement after treatment with MCT, Mathieson laryngeal manual therapy (MLMT), and the cricothyroid visor maneuver (CVM). Paired with abdominal breath support, MCT has improved voice quality in patients with MTD as measured by the DSI. One study found greater improvement in the physical components of the Voice Handicap Index (VHI) for patients with MTD after treatment with MCT versus a greater improvement in voice quality as measured by the DSI using vocal facilitating techniques. Another study found vocal therapy had a greater impact on VHI scores than physical therapy for patients with MTD. It is suggested that patient symptoms determine the appropriate use of voice therapies and manual therapies.

=== Surgery ===
Surgery may be used as a treatment when there is a vocal lesion such as nodule or polyp that is causing the MTD. There is little utility to surgery in primary MTD.
