= Laryngopharyngeal reflux =

Flow of stomach contents into the throat (larynx and pharynx)

- Other names: Extraesophageal reflux disease (EERD), Silent reflux, and Supra-esophageal reflux
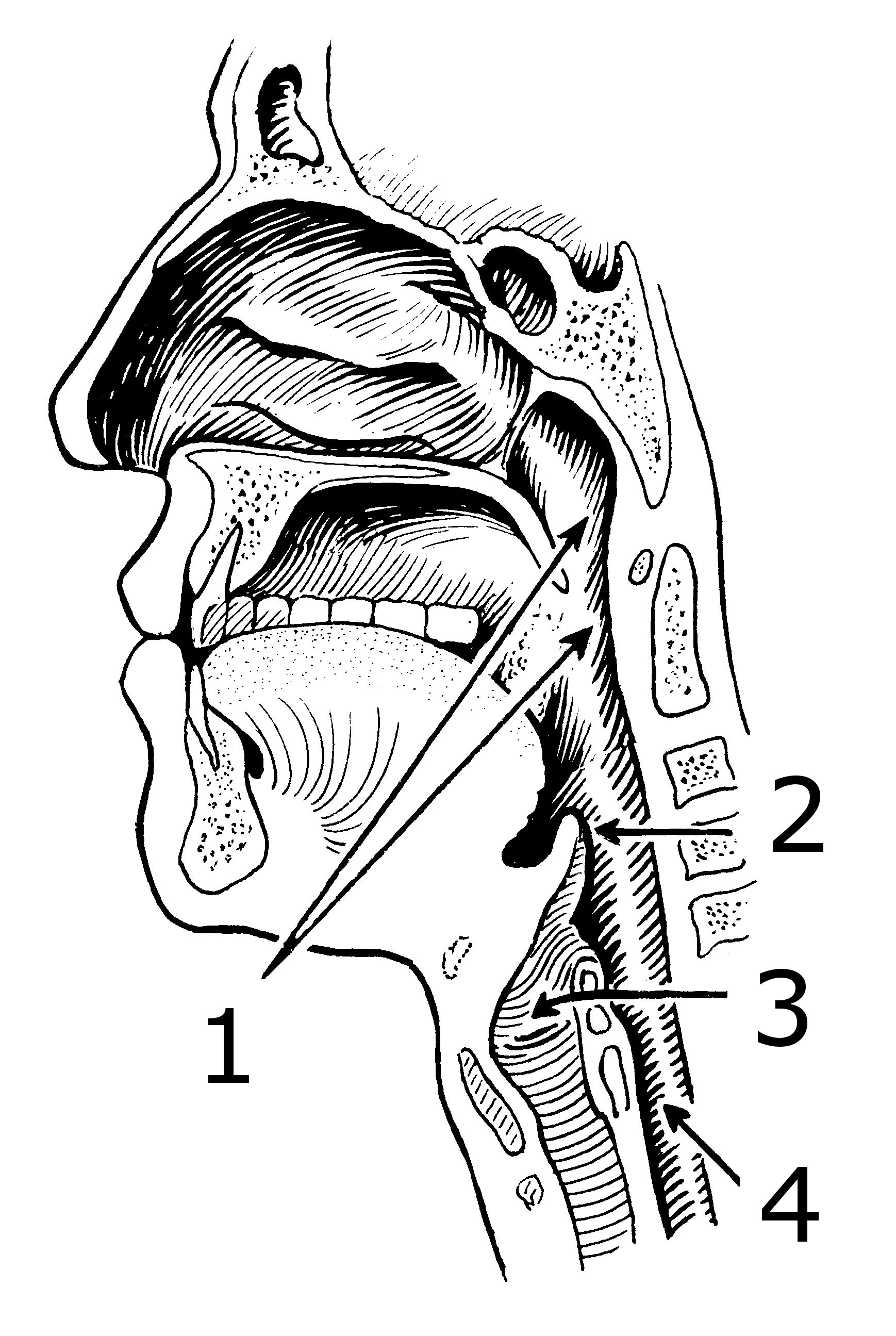
- Sagittal illustration of the anterior portion of the human head and neck. In LPR, the pharynx (1), oropharynx (2) and larynx (3) are exposed to gastric contents that flow upward through the esophagus (4).
- Specialty: Gastroenterology

Laryngopharyngeal reflux (LPR) or laryngopharyngeal reflux disease (LPRD) is the retrograde flow of gastric contents into the larynx, oropharynx and/or the nasopharynx. LPR causes respiratory symptoms such as cough and wheezing and is often associated with head and neck complaints such as dysphonia, globus pharyngeus, and dysphagia. LPR may play a role in other diseases, such as sinusitis, otitis media, and rhinitis, and can be a comorbidity of asthma. While LPR is commonly used interchangeably with gastroesophageal reflux disease (GERD), it presents with a different pathophysiology.

LPR reportedly affects approximately 10% of the U.S. population. However, LPR occurs in as many as 50% of individuals with voice disorders. It may also correlate with the ability to voluntarily burp (supragastric belching).

== Signs and symptoms ==
Extraesophageal symptoms result from exposure of the upper aerodigestive tract to gastric contents. This causes a variety of symptoms, including hoarseness, postnasal drip, sore throat, difficulty swallowing, indigestion, wheezing, globus pharyngeus, and chronic throat-clearing. Some people with LPR have heartburn, while others have little to no heartburn as refluxed stomach contents do not remain in the esophagus long enough to irritate the surrounding tissue. Individuals with more severe forms of LPR may experience abrasion of tooth enamel due to intermittent presence of gastric contents in the oral cavity.

Additionally, LPR can cause inflammation in the vocal tract which results in the symptom of dysphonia or hoarseness. Hoarseness is considered to be one of the primary symptoms of LPR and is associated with complaints such as strain, vocal fatigue, musculoskeletal tension, and hard glottal attacks, all of which can reduce a person's ability to communicate effectively. Moreover, LPR patients may try to compensate for their hoarseness by increasing muscular tension in their vocal tract. This hyper-functional technique adopted in response to the inflammation caused by LPR can lead to a condition called muscle tension dysphonia and may persist even after the hoarseness and inflammation has disappeared. A speech–language pathologist will often need to be involved to help resolve this maladaptive, compensatory pattern through the implementation of voice therapy.

LPR presents as a chronic and intermittent disease in children. LPR in children and infants tends to manifest with a unique set of symptoms. Symptoms seen in children with LPR include a cough, hoarseness, stridor, sore throat, asthma, vomiting, globus sensation, wheezing, aspiration and recurrent pneumonia. Common symptoms of LPR in infants include wheezing, stridor, persistent or recurrent cough, apnea, feeding difficulties, aspiration, regurgitation, and failure to thrive. Moreover, LPR in children is commonly concomitant with laryngeal disorders such as laryngomalacia, subglottic stenosis, and laryngeal papillomatosis.

=== Relationship to GERD ===
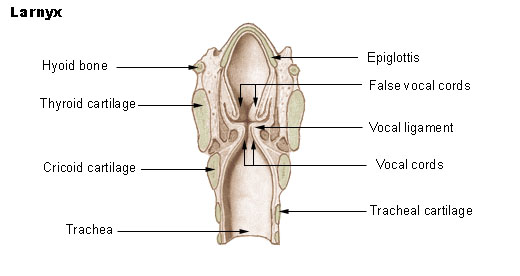
Illustration of the superior view of the larynx. Tissues lining laryngeal structures, including the vocal folds, may be damaged in LPR.

LPR is often regarded as a subtype of gastroesophageal reflux disease (GERD) that occurs when stomach contents flow upward through the esophagus and reach the level of the larynx and pharynx. However, LPR is associated with a distinct presentation of symptoms. LPR and GERD frequently differ in the relative prevalence of heartburn and throat clearing. While heartburn is present in over 80% of GERD cases, it occurs in only 20% of LPR cases. Throat clearing shows the opposite prevalence pattern, occurring in approximately 87% of LPR cases and in fewer than 5% of GERD cases. Unlike GERD, LPR also poses a risk for bronchitis or pneumonitis as reflux of stomach acid to the level of the larynx can result in aspiration. LPR is also commonly associated with erythema, or redness, as well as edema in the tissues of the larynx that are exposed to gastric contents. In contrast, most cases of GERD are nonerosive, with no apparent injury to the mucosal lining of the esophageal tissue exposed to the refluxed material.

Differences in the molecular structure of the epithelial tissue lining the laryngopharyngeal region may be partly responsible for the different symptomatic manifestations of LPR in comparison to GERD. In contrast to the resistant stratified squamous epithelium lining the esophagus, the larynx is lined by ciliated respiratory epithelium, which is more fragile and susceptible to damage. While the epithelium lining the esophagus is capable of withstanding as many as 50 instances of exposure to gastric contents each day, which is the uppermost estimate considered to be within the range of normal physiologic functioning, injury to laryngeal epithelium can occur following exposure to only small amounts of acidic gastric contents.

== Diagnosis ==
LPR presents with non-specific symptoms and signs that make differential diagnosis difficult to achieve. Furthermore, symptoms of the disorder overlap greatly with symptoms of other disorders. Therefore, LPR is under-diagnosed and under-treated. As there are multiple potential etiologies for the respiratory and laryngeal symptoms of LPR, diagnosing LPR based on symptoms alone is unreliable. Laryngoscopic findings such as erythema, edema, laryngeal granulomas, and interarytenoid hypertrophy have been used to establish the diagnosis; however, these findings are nonspecific and have been described in the majority of asymptomatic subjects undergoing laryngoscopy. Response to acid-suppression therapy has been suggested as a diagnostic tool for confirming diagnosis of LPR, but studies have shown that the response to empirical trials of such therapy (as with proton-pump inhibitors) in these patients is often disappointing. Several studies have emphasized the importance of measuring proximal esophageal, or ideally pharyngeal acid exposure, in patients with clinical symptoms of LPR to document reflux as the cause of the symptoms.

Additionally, several potential biomarkers of LPR have been investigated. These include inflammatory cytokines, carbonic anyhydrase, E-cadherin and mucins; however, their direct implications in LPR are still being established. The presence of pepsin, an enzyme produced in the stomach, in the hypopharynx has also become an increasingly researched biomarker for LPR. Research suggests that the stomach enzyme pepsin plays a crucial role in the complex mechanism behind LPR. Once present in the larynx pepsin is active at a low pH, but persists even when inactive. Pepsin can manifest both extracellularly and intracellularly; however, damage is realized differently in these two environments. Intracellularly, pepsin enters the laryngeal tissue through endocytosis and causes damage that accumulates over time. Pepsin has implications on cellular transcription and therefore, gene expression, which subsequently leads to the recruitment of inflammatory cells, but inhibition of protective mechanisms such as growth factors. Structurally, pepsin plays a role in increasing viscosity of the vibratory portion of the vocal folds and decreasing cellular water retention, which reduces the overall thickness of the vocal folds. These morphological changes result in decreased vibratory amplitude, increasing demands for initiating vibration and ultimately, impacting voice quality.

Before a diagnosis can be made, a physician will need to record the patient's medical history and ask for details about the presenting symptoms. Questionnaires such as the Reflux Symptom Index (RSI), Quality-of-Life Index (QLI) for LPR, Glottal Closure/Function Index (GCI) and Voice Handicap Index (VHI) can be administered to gain information about the patient's medical history as well as their symptomatology. A physical examination will then need to be performed with particular concentration around the head and neck. A scope with a specialized camera lens made of fiber optic strands is gently fed down the throat and feeds back images to a monitor. This provides a clear view of the throat and larynx. Signs of LPR include redness, swelling, and obvious irritation. Other, more invasive tests, such as fibre-optic transnasal laryngoscopy, 24-hour ambulatory dual probe pHmetry, pharyngeal pHmetry, transnasal esophagoscopy (TNE) and biopsy may be used. A noninvasive test for diagnosis of LPR is the collection of refluxate where the refluxed material is collected and analyzed for the presence of pepsin in an immunoassay; these have shown moderate sensitivity and specificity for diagnosis of the condition. Another noninvasive diagnostic test that can be used is an empirical trial of proton-pump inhibitor therapy; however, this test is mostly successful in diagnosing GERD.

There is no agreed-upon assessment technique to identify LPR in children. Of the debated diagnostic tools, multichannel intraluminal impedance with pH monitoring (MII-pH) is used as it recognizes both acid and non-acid reflux. A more common technique that is used is 24-hour dual probe pH monitoring. Both of these tools are expensive and are therefore not widely used.

== Treatment ==
Management of symptoms for patients within this subgroup of the GERD spectrum is difficult. Once these patients are identified, behavioural and dietary changes are advised. Dietary modifications may include limiting the intake of chocolate, caffeine, acidic food and liquids, gaseous beverages and foods high in fat. Behavioral changes may include weight loss, cessation of smoking, limiting alcohol consumption, and avoiding the ingestion of food shortly before bed, sleeping on one's left side, and sleeping on an incline. Lifestyle changes in children diagnosed with LPR include dietary modifications to avoid foods that will aggravate reflux (e.g., chocolate or acidic and spicy food), altering positioning (e.g., sleeping on your left side), modifying the textures of foods (e.g., thickening feeds to heighten awareness of the passing bolus), and eliminating the intake of food before bed.

Proton-pump inhibitors (PPIs) are the leading pharmaceutical intervention chosen for the relief and reduction of LPR and are typically recommended for ongoing use twice a day for a period of 3–6 months. PPIs have been shown to be ineffective in very young children and are of uncertain efficacy in older children, for whom their use has been discouraged. While PPIs may provide limited clinical benefits in some adults, there is insufficient evidence to support routine use. Many studies show that PPIs are not more effective than placebos in treating LPR. Alginate products can form a temporary foam barrier at the lower oesophageal sphincter to block acid and pepsin from refluxing. Higher strength Gaviscon, an antacid, uses alginate.

When medical management fails, Nissen fundoplication can be offered. However, patients should be advised that surgery may not result in complete elimination of LPR symptoms and even with immediate success, recurrence of symptoms later on is still possible.

One way to assess treatment outcomes for LPR is through the use of voice quality measures. Both subjective and objective measures of voice quality can be used to assess treatment outcomes. Subjective measures include scales such as the Grade, Roughness, Breathiness, Asthenia, Strain Scale (GRBAS); the Reflux Symptom Index; the Voice Handicap Index (VHI); and a voice symptom scale. Objective measures often rely on acoustic parameters such as jitter, shimmer, signal-to-noise ratio, and fundamental frequency, among others. Aerodynamic measures such as vital capacity and maximum phonation time (MPT) have also been used as an objective measure. However, there is not yet a consensus on how best to use the measures or which measures are best to assess treatment outcomes for LPR.

=== Procedures ===
There is tentative evidence from non-controlled trials that oral neuromuscular training may improve symptoms. This has been approved by the UK National Health Service (NHS) for supply on prescription from 1 May 2022.

== Cancer risk ==
Although tobacco smoking is the most recognized risk factor for hypopharyngeal cancer, biliary reflux has recently been implicated in hypopharyngeal squamous cell carcinoma. Weakly acidic bile may increase the risk for hypopharyngeal carcinogenesis by inducing DNA damage. DNA damage, such as DNA strand breaks, can be induced by the bile acid glycochenodeoxycholic acid present in reflux.

== History ==
LPR was not discussed as a separate condition from GERD until the 1970s and 1980s. However, at around the same time that GERD was first recognized as a clinical entity in the mid-1930s, a link between gut symptoms and airway disease was suggested. Later, acid-related laryngeal ulcerations and granulomas were reported in 1968. Subsequent studies suggested that acid reflux might be a contributory factor in other laryngeal and respiratory conditions. In 1979, the link between these airway symptoms and reflux of gastric contents was first documented. At the same time, treatment of reflux disease results was shown to eliminate these airway symptoms.
