= Hypopharyngeal cancer =

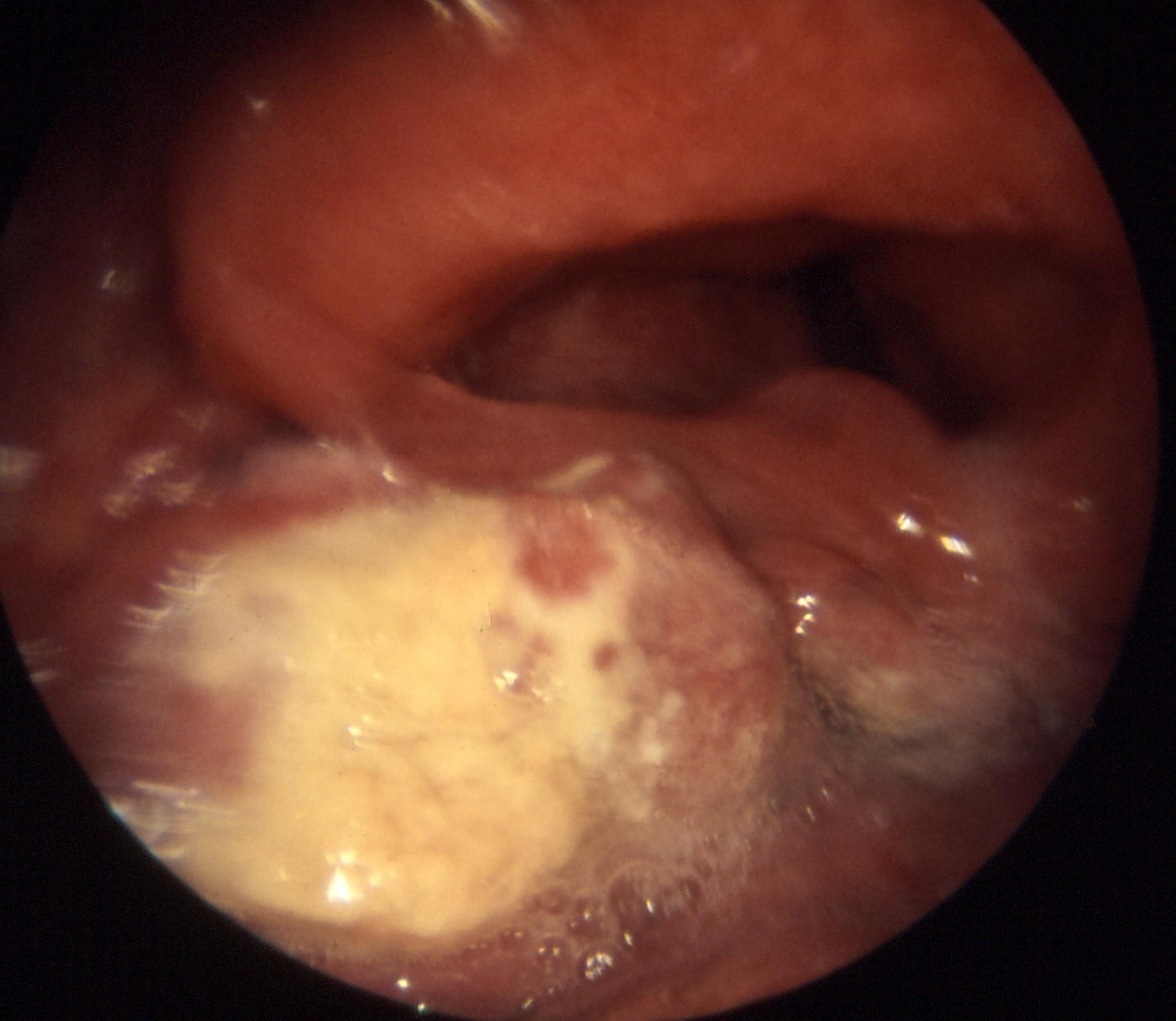
- Specialty: Oncology

Hypopharyngeal cancer is a disease in which malignant cells grow in the hypopharynx (also known as the laryngopharynx) the area where the larynx and esophagus meet.

It first forms in the outer layer (epithelium) of the hypopharynx (last part of the pharynx), which is split into three areas. Progression of the disease is defined by the spread of cancer into one or more areas and into deeper tissues.

This type of cancer is rare. Only about 2,500 cases are seen in the US each year. Because of this, Hypopharyngeal Cancer is difficult to catch in its earliest stages and has one of the highest mortality rates of any head and neck cancer.

== Signs and symptoms ==
Symptoms of Hypopharyngeal Cancer include:

- Swollen lymph nodes in the neck (first sign of a problem in half of all patients)
- Sore throat in one location that persists after treatment
- Pain that radiates from the throat to the ears
- Difficult or painful swallowing (often leads to malnutrition and weight loss because of a refusal to eat)
- Voice changes (late stage cancer)

== Cause ==
Factors that contribute to the development of hypopharyngeal cancer include:

- Smoking
- Chewing tobacco
- Heavy alcohol use
- Poor diet
- Bile reflux

Smoking, like lung cancer, can cause hypopharyngeal cancer because it contains carcinogens that alter the DNA or RNA in a dividing cell. These alterations may change a normal DNA sequence to an oncogene, a gene that causes cancer after exposure to a carcinogen.

Squamous cells, a type of cell that lines hollow organs like the throat, mouth, lungs, and outer layer of skin, are particularly vulnerable when exposed to cigarette smoke.

Chewing tobacco can have the same effects as smoking and is also linked to hypopharyngeal cancer. The chewing tobacco is placed into the mouth, leaving it exposed to enzymes, like amylase, which partly digests the carcinogenic material. Saliva is swallowed, along with the cancer-promoting material, which passes through the hypopharynx on its way to the esophagus.

Heavy alcohol use is linked to hypopharyngeal cancer as well. Alcohol damages the lining of the hypopharynx, increasing the amount of chemicals that are allowed to seep into the underlying membranes. Heavy alcohol use is also associated with nutritional deficiencies.

Laryngopharyngeal reflux is considered to be a risk factor for development of hypopharyngeal cancer. Such reflux frequently contains bile acids, and bile acid presence in the upper aerodigestive tract is associated with inflammation, DNA damage and neoplastic changes. Tobacco smoking, the most well known risk factor for hypopharyngeal cancer, in combination with deoxycholic acid in bile reflux, promotes hypopharyngeal squamous cell carcinoma via NF-kB activation Bile reflux can induce DNA damage leading to NF-kB activation as well as PARP1 activation (an indicator of DNA damage) in hypopharyngeal cells, and these early events may lead to hypopharyngeal cancer.

A disease called Plummer–Vinson syndrome, a genetic disorder that causes a long-term iron deficiency, may also lead to hypopharyngeal cancer. Other factors like a deficiency in certain vitamins also appear to contribute to this type of cancer.

== Diagnosis ==
=== Stages and survival rates ===
Staging cancer is a way of marking the cancer's progression and is measured on a 0 to 4 (IV) scale. To determine each stage, smaller categories must be defined first: T. N. M. (tumor, lymph nodes, and metastasis). These were developed by the American Joint Committee on Cancer.

==== Early stage ====
Stages of Hypopharyngeal Cancer
	Tumor (T)	Lymph Nodes (L)	Metastasis (M)
Stage 0	Epithelium Only	None	M0
Stage 1	T1	None	M0
Stage 2	T2	None	M0
Stage 3	T1-T3 Or T3	N1 None	M0 M0
Stage 4 (A)	T1-T3 Or T4	N2 N1-N2	M0 M0
Stage 4 (B)	T4	N1, N2 or N3	M0
Stage 4 (C)	T1-T4	N1-N2	M1

Stage 0

This implies that a tumor was found in the epithelium, the layer of tissue closest to the top, but not in the connective tissue. A patient would not have swollen lymph nodes and the cancer has not metastasized to other tissues or organs. This is almost never diagnosed in the case of Hypopharyngeal Cancer.

Stage I (1)

T1: the tumor is less than 2 cm across and is limited to one area in the hypopharynx. There is still no lymph node involvement and no metastasis.

Stage I Hypopharyngeal Cancer has a five-year survival rate of 41%, but this type of cancer is rarely caught in Stage I because the first signs and symptoms are often unnoticed or patients remain asymptomatic.

Stage II (2)

T2: the tumor has grown to affect more than one area of the hypopharynx and is between 2 and 4 centimeters with no lymph node involvement and no metastasis.

==== Late stage ====
Stage III (3)

T1 or T2 or T3: the tumor's growth is between less than 2 cm and more than 4 cm and may be affecting the vocal cords. AND N1: cancer has spread to one lymph node (same side of the neck as tumor), which has swollen to 3 cm or less. OR T3: the tumor is more than 4 cm and is affecting the vocal cords. BUT there is no lymph node involvement.

Note: The distinction between the two is made by the oncologist.

Stage II and III have a five-year survival rate of 36%.

Stage IV (4)

The final stage has three subsets depending on the severity of the cancer.

Stage IVA

T1 or T2 or T3: the tumor is between less than 2 cm or more than 4 cm.

AND N2: cancer has spread to one or more lymph nodes, less than 6 cm, on one or both sides of the neck.

OR

T4: the tumor is affecting different areas outside of the hypopharynx, starting with the throat and moving towards the spine and chest cavity.

AND N1 or N2: cancer is affecting 1 or more lymph nodes that are between less than 3 and less than 6 cm on one or both sides of the throat.

Stage IVB

T4: The tumor is affecting areas outside of the hypopharynx.

N1 or N2 or N3: Lymph nodes are between less than 3 or up to 6 cm on one or both sides of the neck.

Stage IVC (end stage)

The cancer could be anything from T1 to T4, N1 to N4, but the major difference is that the cancer has metastasized (M1) to other organs away from the hypopharynx.

Stage IV hypopharyneal cancer only has a 10% five-year survival.

Most cases of hypopharyneal cancer are found in the end stage because the cancer is close to several large lymphatic vessels, easily spreading to other regions of the body.

=== Tests to diagnose hypopharyngeal cancer ===
There are several ways to diagnose Hypopharyngeal Cancer.

- Physical Examination:

The doctor checks for swollen lymph nodes and may look down the patient's throat with a long handled mirror.

- Endoscopy:

Inserted into the nose or mouth of the patient, this uses a thin fiberoptic camera that allows the doctor to see directly down the throat.

- Biopsy:

This is a small tissue sample taken from the lesion. The tissue is analyzed for the presences of cancer cells.

- CT scan or MRI:

These tests will give doctors a detailed cross-sectional image of the area in question in the body. It can confirm or suggest a diagnosis and also stage extent of disease.

== Management ==
Treatment of hypopharyngeal cancer depends on the prognosis (chance of recovery), age, stage, and general health of the patient. Because hypopharyngeal cancer is often advanced at the time of diagnosis, treatment also depends on the overall goal. The goal may simply be to keep the patient talking, eating, and breathing normally.

Treatment usually begins with surgery and then a course of radiation for cancer that has progressed past Stage I. For cancer that is advanced, which is typical of hypopharyngeal cancer, neoadjuvant chemotherapy may be used. This is performed by administering chemotherapy before surgery. Neoadjuvant chemotherapy in conjunction with radiation and surgery has yielded the best results in patients with Stage III and Stage IV cancers.
