= List of voice disorders =

Voice disorders are medical conditions involving abnormal pitch, loudness or quality of the sound produced by the larynx and thereby affecting speech production. These include:

- Vocal cord nodule
- Vocal fold cysts
- Vocal cord paresis
- Reinke's edema
- Spasmodic dysphonia
- Foreign accent syndrome
- Bogart–Bacall syndrome
- Laryngeal papillomatosis
- Laryngitis
- Puberphonia

== See also ==
- Aphasia
- Dysphonia
- Human voice
- Laryngectomy
- Parkinson's disease
- Speech disorder
- Vocology
- Voice changes during puberty
