= Reactive gastropathy =

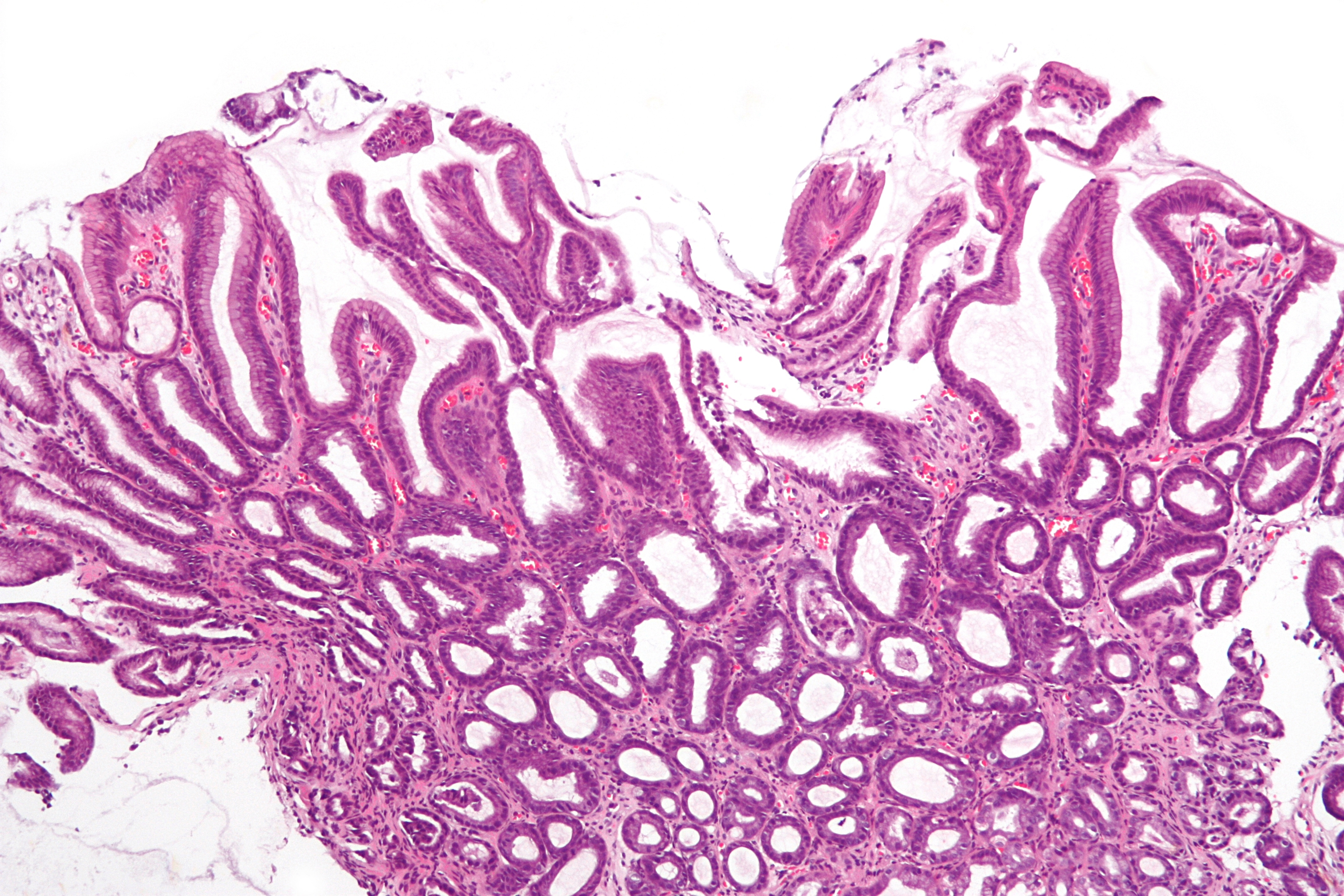
- Micrograph of a reactive gastropathy. H&E stain.
- Specialty: Pathology, gastroenterology

Reactive gastropathy, chemical gastropathy also called gastritis of « C type » or "chemical gastritis" is an abnormality in the stomach caused by chemicals, e.g. bile, alcohol, and characteristically has minimal inflammation.

== Cause ==
Reactive gastropathy has a large number of causes, including:

- Alcohol use disorder.
- Bile reflux, such as may be seen post-Billroth II.
- NSAIDs.

== Diagnosis ==
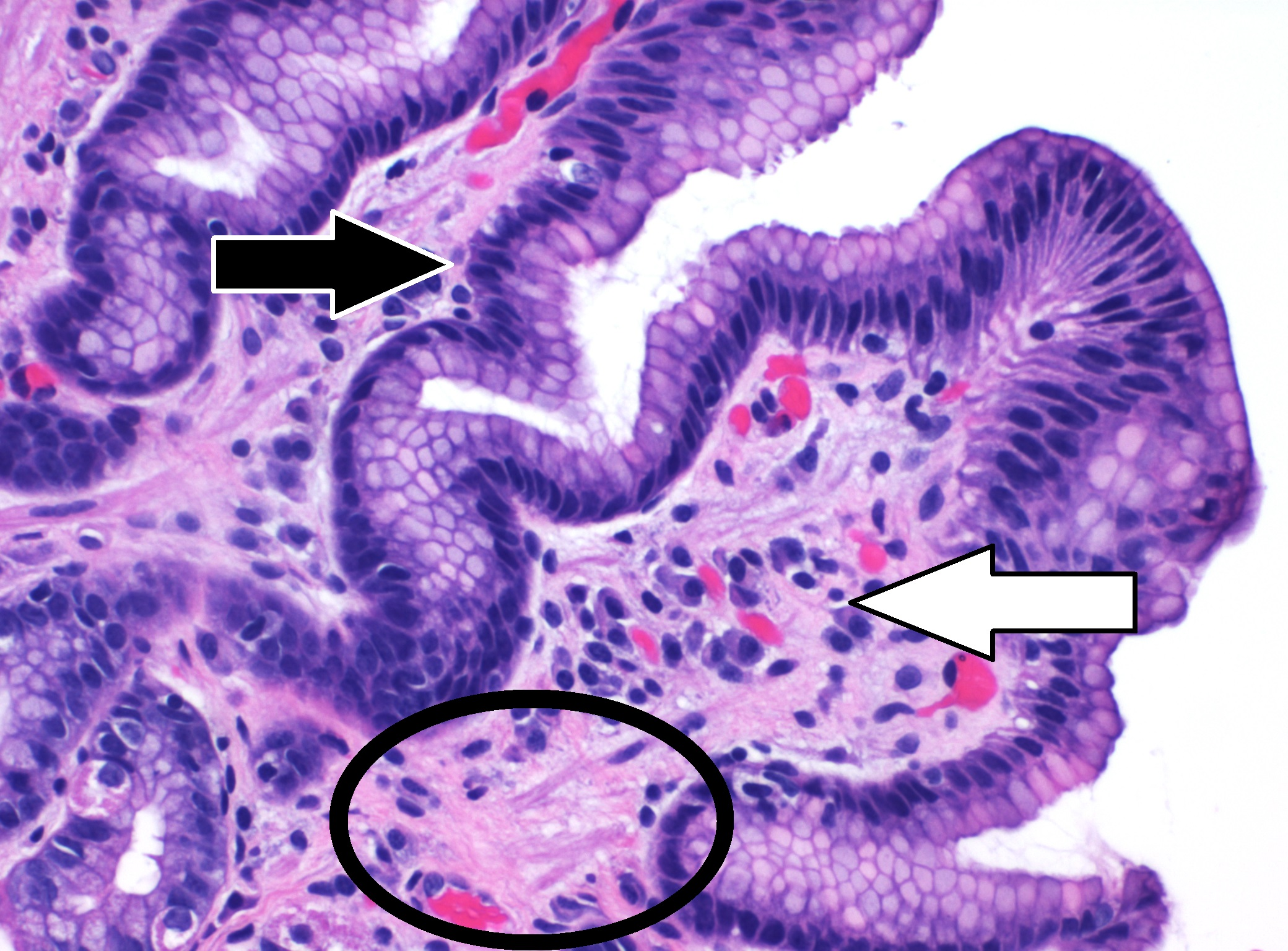
Reactive gastropathy, is characterized histologically by: Foveolar hyperplasia (black arrow), as a tortuosity in the "neck" region of the gastric glands.; Scant or minimal inflammatory cells (white arrow), i.e. lack of large numbers of neutrophils and plasma cells..; Smooth muscle hyperplasia in the lamina propria (in black oval).

The diagnosis is by examination of tissue, e.g. a stomach biopsy.

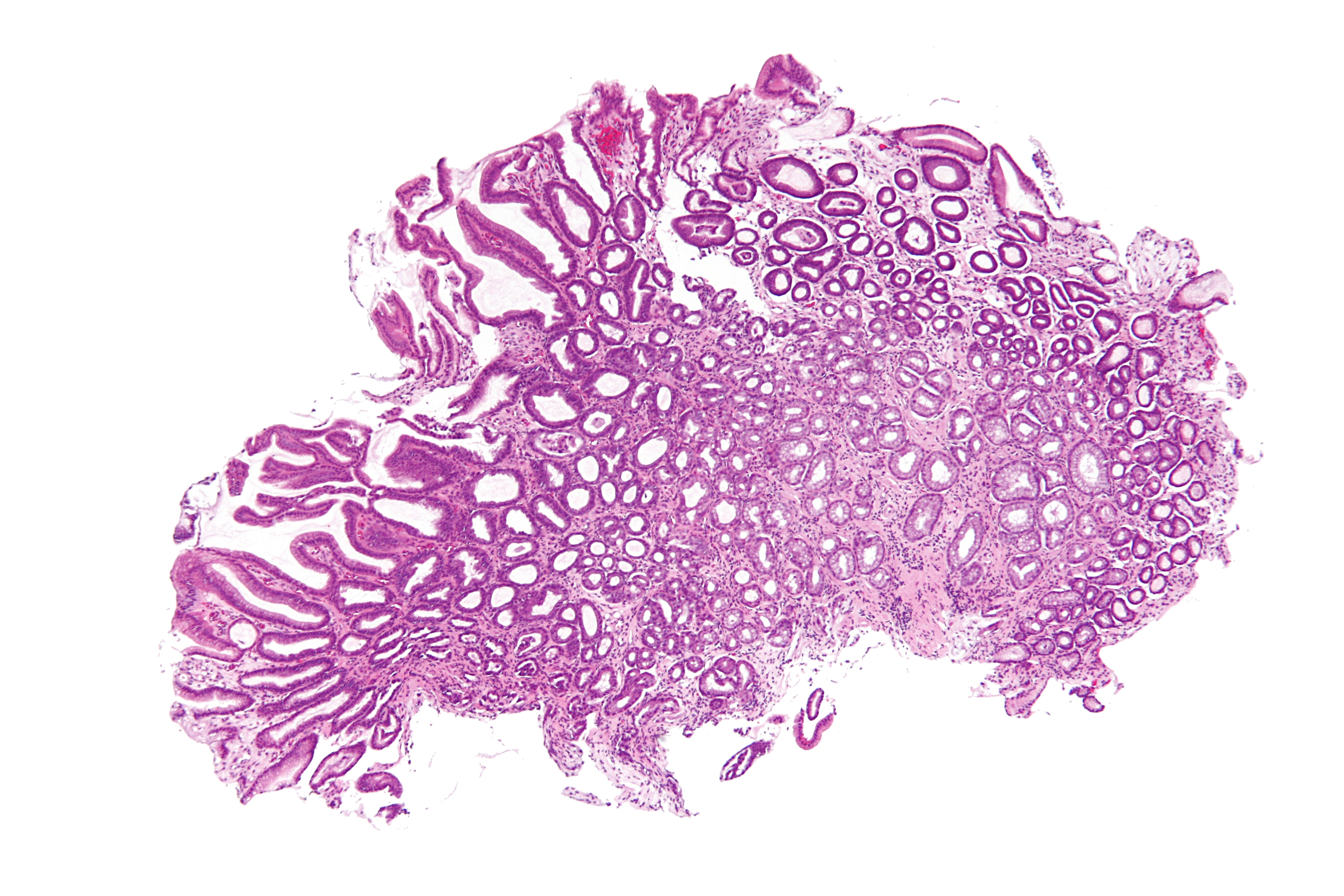
Low mag.

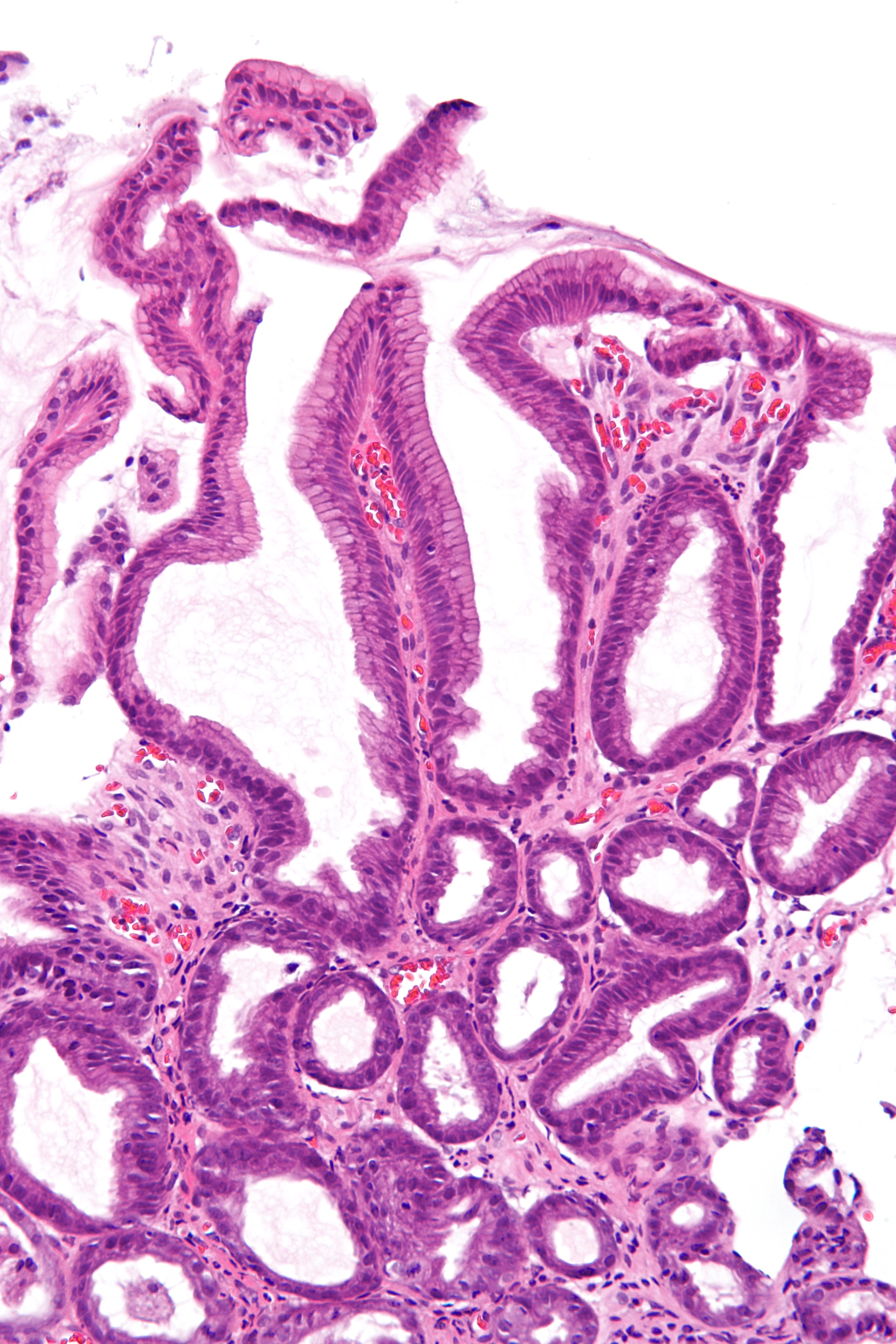
High mag.

== Relation to gastritis ==
Reactive gastropathy is morphologically distinct entity that can be separated from gastritis, which by definition has a significant inflammatory component.

As a reactive gastropathy may mimic a (true) gastritis symptomatically and visually in an endoscopic examination, it may incorrectly be referred to as a gastritis. Even aware of the underlying etiology of the pathologic process, e.g. NSAID use, the label "chemical gastritis" is applied to a chemical gastropathy.

== See also ==
- Gastritis
