= Blue Cross Blue Shield of Massachusetts Foundation =

Non-profit organization promoting health access in Massachusetts

- Formation: 2001
- Type: Nonprofit organization
- Headquarters: Boston, MA, United States
- President: Philip W. Johnston
- Revenue: $-841,822 (2015)
- Expenses: $8,595,034 (2015)
- Website: www.bluecrossfoundation.org

The Blue Cross Blue Shield of Massachusetts Foundation is a private, non-profit organization. The Foundation's mandate is to expand access to health care for vulnerable and low-income people in the Commonwealth of Massachusetts. The Foundation was established in 2001, with an endowment of $55 million from Blue Cross Blue Shield of Massachusetts. The Foundation collaborates with organizations to broaden health coverage and reduce barriers to care. The Foundation makes grants, undertakes and collaborates on research projects, and furthers various policy initiatives. The Foundation has played an important role in Massachusetts' health care reform law, and implementation activities.
