= Videostroboscopy =

Medical imaging method

Videostroboscopy is a high-speed medical imaging method used to visualize the dynamics of human vocal fold vibration.

When stimulated by the pressure of breath exhaled from the lungs, the two vocal folds (also known as vocal cords) open and close rapidly. This process is called phonation and produces the sound of the human voice.

During phonation, the vocal folds open and close too rapidly for the unassisted eye to observe their movement. This poses a problem to clinicians because abnormalities in these movements are often indicative of a voice disorder. Videostroboscopy is one method by which this problem is overcome.

The clinician uses an endoscope containing an embedded video camera and stroboscope, which is passed through the nasal passage and into the pharynx of the subject, who then initiates phonation and vocalizes while the vocal folds are recorded. In the resulting stroboscopic video recording, the vocal folds appear slow enough to observe the precise nature of the movement, enabling the diagnosis of a range of problems.

== See also ==
- Videokymography
- Human voice
- Voice disorders
