= Biliary reflux =

Abnormal flow of intestinal contents into the stomach and esophagus

- Other names: bile reflux, duodenogastroesophageal reflux (DGER), duodenogastric reflux
- The location of bile duct and gallbladder in relation to stomach
- Specialty: Gastroenterology

Biliary reflux, also called bile reflux, duodenogastroesophageal reflux (DGER) or duodenogastric reflux, is a condition that occurs when bile and/or other contents like bicarbonate and pancreatic enzymes flow upward (refluxes) from the duodenum into the stomach and esophagus.

Biliary reflux is often mistaken for acid reflux (gastroesophageal reflux disease, GERD). The difference is in the fluid involved:

- Acid reflux (GERD): stomach acid moves up into the esophagus.
- Bile reflux: bile and enzymes from the small intestine move into the stomach and esophagus.

These conditions are often related, and differentiating between the two can be difficult.

Bile is a digestive fluid made by the liver, stored in the gallbladder, and discharged into the duodenum after food is ingested to aid in the digestion of fat. Normally, the pyloric sphincter prevents bile from entering the stomach. When the pyloric sphincter is damaged or fails to work correctly, bile can enter the stomach and then be transported into the esophagus as in gastric reflux. The presence of small amounts of bile in the stomach is relatively common and usually asymptomatic, but excessive refluxed bile causes irritation and inflammation. Bile reflux has been associated with gastric cancer, chemical gastritis and the development of ulcers.

== Symptoms and signs ==
- Frequent heartburn
- Pain in the upper part of the abdomen
- Vomiting and/or regurgitating bile
- Hypersalivation

Bile reflux can be asymptomatic when lying down or after eating, as bile reflux occurs physiologically.

== Diagnosis ==
Bile reflux is usually associated with:

- Erosive esophagitis
- Barrett's esophagus

== Management ==
Ursodeoxycholic acid is an adequate treatment of bile reflux gastritis. The dosage is usually of: Adult(body-weight 47kg and above): 250mg once daily for 10-14 days, dose to be taken at bedtime.

=== Surgery ===
Biliary reflux may also be treated surgically, if medications are ineffective or if precancerous tissue is present in the esophagus.

== Epidemiology ==
Obesity is an independent risk factor for development of bile reflux. Bile reflux is very infrequent in healthy individuals. After surgical operations such as a cholecysectomy, bile reflux gastritis occurs in approximately 15-35% of patients, with higher rates in those with gastric emptying or sphincter of Oddi dysfunction.

Bile acids are frequently present in the gastroesophageal refluxate, and thus can cause inflammatory and neoplastic changes in the upper aerodigestive tract. Bile reflux appears to be a causal factor in human hypopharyngeal squamous cell carcinoma. In a mouse study it was shown that acidic bile refluxate causes oxidative DNA damage leading to progressive mutagenic effects and hypopharyngeal squamous cell carcinogenesis.
