= Laryngitis =

Inflammation of the larynx (voice box)

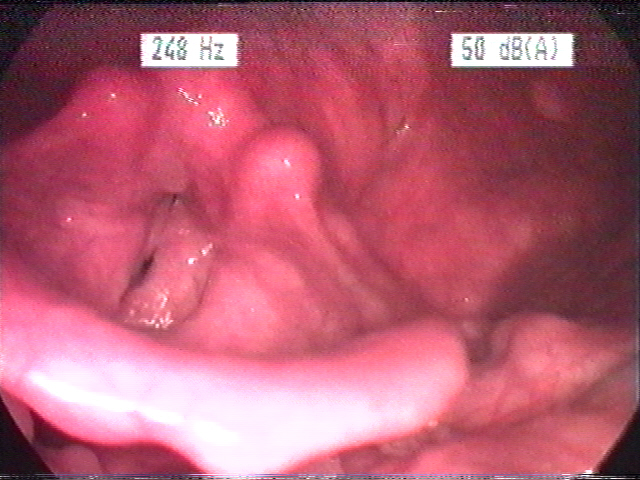
- Endoscopic image of an inflamed larynx caused by acid reflux
- Pronunciation: /ˌlærɪnˈdʒaɪtɪs/
- Specialty: Otorhinolaryngology
- Symptoms: Hoarse voice, aphonia, fever, pain
- Duration: Usually a little more than 2 weeks
- Causes: Viral, trauma, bacterial
- Diagnostic method: Based on symptoms, examination via laryngoscopy if concerns
- Differential diagnosis: Epiglottitis, laryngeal cancer, croup
- Treatment: Voice rest, fluids
- Frequency: Common

Laryngitis is inflammation of the larynx (voice box). The primary symptom is loss of some vocal function, ranging from hoarse voice to no voice at all. Laryngitis can be caused by overuse of the vocal chords, or by other inflammation, trauma, or infection. The accompanying symptoms depend on the primary cause. Typically, these last under 2 weeks.

== Signs and symptoms ==
The primary symptom of laryngitis is a hoarse voice or aphonia, when there is no sound at all. Because laryngitis can have various causes, other signs and symptoms may vary. They can include:

- Dry or sore throat
- Coughing (both a causal factor and a symptom of laryngitis)
- Frequent throat clearing
- Increased saliva production
- Dysphagia (difficulty swallowing)
- Sensation of swelling in the area of the larynx (discomfort in the front of the neck)
- Globus pharyngeus (feeling as if there were a lump in the throat)
- Cold or flu-like symptoms (which, like a cough, may also be a causal factor for laryngitis)
- Swollen lymph nodes in the throat, chest, or face
- Fever
- General muscle pain (myalgia)
- Shortness of breath, predominantly in children

=== Voice quality ===
Aside from a hoarse-sounding voice, changes to pitch and volume may occur with laryngitis. Speakers may experience a lower or higher pitch than normal, depending on whether their vocal folds are swollen or stiff. They may also have breathier voices, as more air flows through the space between the vocal folds (the glottis), quieter volume, and a reduced range.

== Causes ==
Laryngitis is categorized as acute if it lasts less than 3 weeks and chronic if symptoms last more than 3 weeks. Acute cases usually occur as part of a viral upper respiratory tract infection, other infections, and trauma such as from coughing or other causes. Chronic cases may occur due to smoking, tuberculosis, allergies, acid reflux, rheumatoid arthritis, or sarcoidosis. The underlying mechanism involves irritation of the vocal cords.

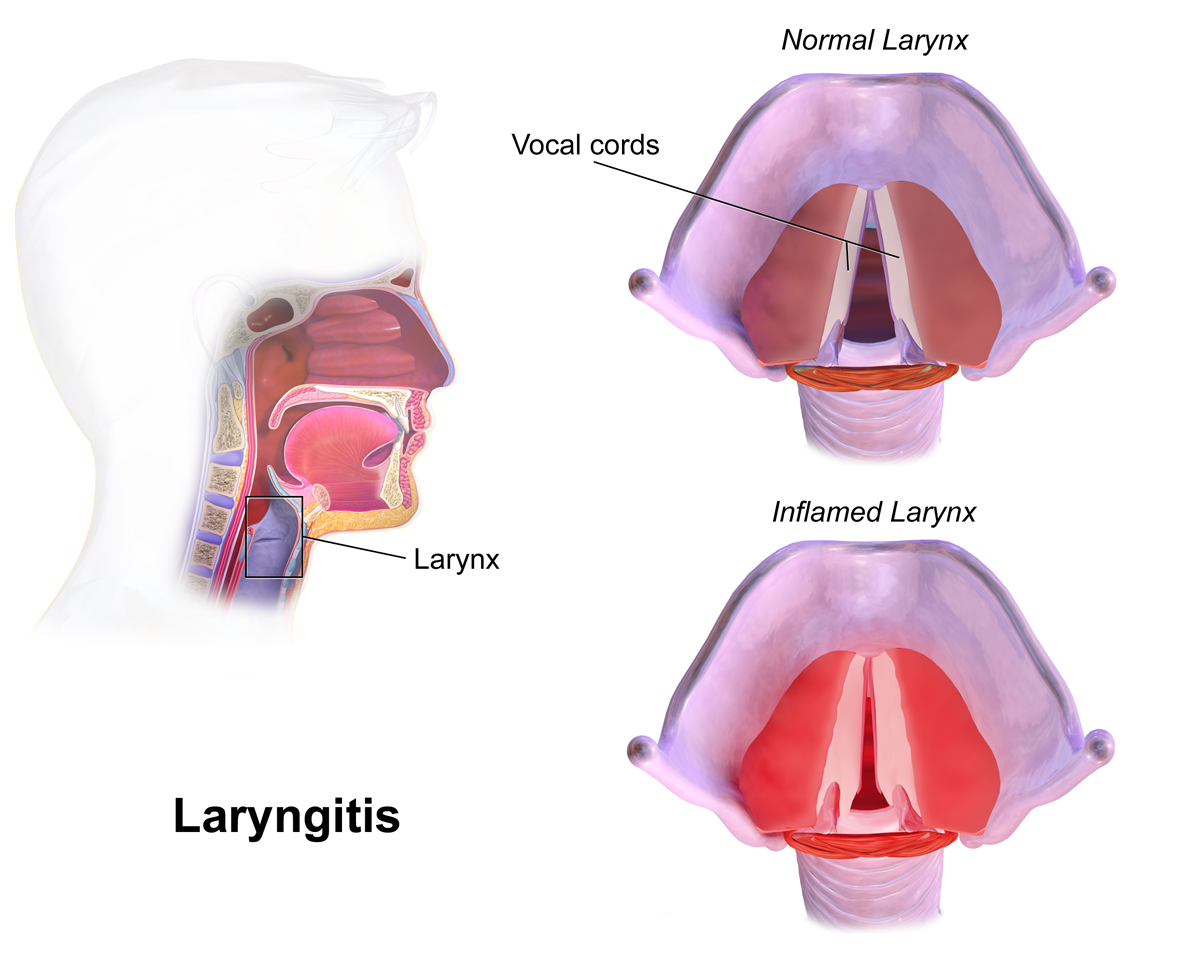
Laryngitis

Laryngitis can be infectious as well as noninfectious in origin. The resulting inflammation of the vocal folds distorts the sound produced there. It normally develops in response to either an infection, trauma to the vocal folds, or allergies. Chronic laryngitis may also be caused by more severe problems, such as nerve damage, sores, and polyps, or hard and thick lumps (nodules) on the vocal cords.

=== Acute ===
==== Viral ====
- Viral infections cause most cases of acute laryngitis, the most common of which tend to be rhinovirus, influenza virus, parainfluenza virus, adenovirus, coronavirus, and respiratory syncytial virus (RSV). In patients who have a compromised immune system, other viruses such as herpes and human immunodeficiency virus (HIV) may also be potential causes.

==== Bacterial ====
- This is another major cause of acute laryngitis. It may develop in conjunction with or due to a bacterial infection. Common bacterial strains are group A streptococcus, Streptococcus pneumoniae, Corynebacterium diphtheriae, Moraxella catarrhalis, Haemophilus influenzae, Bordetella pertussis, Bacillus anthracis,, and Mycobacterium tuberculosis. In developing countries, more unusual bacterial cases may occur, such as mycobacterial and syphilitic, though these may occur in developed nations as well.

==== Fungal ====
- Laryngitis caused by fungal infection is common but not frequently diagnosed, according to a review by BMJ, and can account for up to 10% of acute laryngitis cases. Patients with both functioning and impaired immune systems can develop fungal laryngitis, which may develop as a result of recent antibiotic or inhaled corticosteroids use. Certain strains of fungi that may cause laryngitis include, Histoplasma, Blastomyces, Candida (especially in immunocompromised persons), Cryptococcus, and Coccidioides.

==== Trauma ====
- Trauma is often due to excessive use of the vocal folds, such as by yelling, screaming, or singing. Though this often results in damage to the outer layers of the vocal folds, the subsequent healing process may change the physiology of the folds. Another potential cause of inflammation may be overuse of the vocal cords. Laryngeal trauma, including iatrogenic (caused by endotracheal intubation), can also result in inflammation of the vocal cords.

=== Chronic ===
==== Allergies ====
- Findings are unclear as to whether asthma may cause symptoms commonly associated with laryngitis. Some researchers have posited that allergic causes of laryngitis are often misdiagnosed as being the result of acid reflux.

==== Reflux ====
- One possible explanation of chronic laryngitis is that inflammation is caused by gastroesophageal reflux, which causes subsequent irritation of the vocal folds.

==== Autoimmune disorders ====
- Approximately 30 and 75% of persons with rheumatoid arthritis report symptoms of laryngitis.
- Symptoms of laryngitis are present in only 0.5–5% of people who have sarcoidosis. According to a meta-analysis by Silva et al. (2007), this disease is often an uncommon cause of laryngeal symptoms and is frequently misdiagnosed as another voice disorder.

== Diagnosis ==
Laryngitis is generally more common in women than men, as women's vocal cords are thinner and thus more prone to damage. Concerning signs that may require further investigation include stridor, history of radiation therapy to the neck, trouble swallowing, duration of more than 3 weeks, and a history of smoking. If concerning signs are present. The vocal cords should be examined via laryngoscopy. Other conditions that can produce similar symptoms include epiglottitis, croup, inhaling a foreign body, and laryngeal cancer.

Diagnosis of different forms of acute laryngitis includes:

- Laryngitis following trauma: This form of laryngitis is usually identified by obtaining a case history providing information on previous phono-traumatic experiences, internal trauma caused by recent procedures, as well as any previous neck injuries.
- Acute viral laryngitis: This form of laryngitis is characterized by lower vocal pitch as well as hoarseness. The symptoms in this form of laryngitis are usually present for less than 1 week, however they can persist for 3–4 weeks. This form of laryngitis might also be accompanied by upper respiratory tract symptoms such as sore throat, odynophagia, rhinorrhea, dyspnea, postnasal discharge, and congestion.
- Fungal laryngitis: A biopsy and culture of an abnormal lesion may help confirm fungal laryngitis.

=== Visual diagnosis ===
The larynx itself will often show erythema (reddening) and edema (swelling). This can be seen with laryngoscopy or stroboscopy (method depends on the type of laryngitis). Stroboscopy may be relatively normal or may reveal asymmetry, aperiodicity, and reduced mucosal wave patterns.Other features of the laryngeal tissues may include

- Redness of the laryngeal tissues (acute)
- Dilated blood vessels (acute)
- Thick, yet dry laryngeal tissue (chronic)
- Stiff vocal folds
- Sticky secretions between the vocal folds and nearby structures (the interarytenoid region)

=== Referral ===
Some signs and symptoms indicate the need for early referral. These include:

- Difficulty swallowing
- Vocal stridor
- Ear pain
- Recent weight loss
- History of smoking
- Current or recent radiotherapy treatment (in the neck region)
- Recent neck surgery or surgery involving endotracheal tubing
- Person is a professional voice user (teacher, singer, actor, call center worker, etc.)

=== Differential diagnosis ===
- Acute epiglottitis: This is more likely in those with stridor, drooling, and painful or trouble swallowing.
- Spasmodic dysphonia
- Reflux laryngitis
- Chronic allergic laryngitis
- Neoplasm
- Croup: This presents with a barking cough, hoarseness of voice, and inspiratory stridor.

== Treatment ==
The acute form of the infection, or acute laryngitis, generally resolves without specific treatment. Resting the voice and sufficient fluids may help. Antibiotics generally do not appear to be useful in the acute form. The acute form is common, while the chronic form of the infection, or chronic laryngitis, is not. Chronic laryngitis occurs most often in middle age and is more common in men than women.

Treatment is often supportive in nature and depends on the severity and type of laryngitis (acute or chronic). General measures to relieve symptoms of laryngitis include behavior modification, hydration, and humidification.

Vocal hygiene (care of the voice) is very important to relieve symptoms of laryngitis. Vocal hygiene involves measures such as resting the voice, drinking sufficient water, reducing caffeine and alcohol intake, stopping smoking, and limiting throat clearing.

=== Acute laryngitis ===
In general, acute laryngitis treatment involves vocal hygiene, painkillers (analgesics), humidification, and antibiotics.

==== Viral ====
The suggested treatment for viral laryngitis involves vocal rest, pain medication, and mucolytics for frequent coughing. Home remedies such as tea and honey may also be helpful. Antibiotics are not used for the treatment of viral laryngitis.

==== Bacterial ====
Antibiotics may be prescribed for bacterial laryngitis, especially when symptoms of upper respiratory infection are present. However, the use of antibiotics is highly debated for acute laryngitis. This relates to issues of effectiveness, side effects, cost, and the possibility of antibiotic resistance patterns. Overall, antibiotics do not appear to be very effective in the treatment of acute laryngitis.

In severe cases of bacterial laryngitis, such as supraglottitis or epiglottitis, there is a higher risk of the airway becoming blocked. An urgent referral to a physician should be made to manage the airway. Treatment may involve humidification, corticosteroids, intravenous antibiotics, and nebulised adrenaline.

==== Fungal ====
Fungal laryngitis can be treated with oral antifungal tablets and antifungal solutions. These are typically used for up to 3 weeks, and treatment may need to be repeated if the fungal infection returns.

==== Trauma ====
Laryngitis caused by excessive use or misuse of the voice can be managed through vocal hygiene measures.

=== Chronic laryngitis ===
==== Reflux ====
Laryngopharyngeal reflux treatment primarily involves behavioral management and medication. Behavioral management involves aspects such as:

- Wearing loose clothing
- Eating smaller, more frequent meals
- Avoiding certain foods (e.g., caffeine, alcohol, spicy foods)

Anti-reflux medications may be prescribed for patients with signs of chronic laryngitis and a hoarse voice. If anti-reflux treatment does not result in a decrease of symptoms, other possible causes should be examined. Over-the-counter medications for neutralizing acids (antacids) and acid suppressants (H-2 blockers) may be used. Antacids are often short-acting and may not be sufficient for treatment. Proton pump inhibitors are an effective type of medication. These should only be prescribed for a set period of time, after which the symptoms should be reviewed due to significant long-term side effects, such as bone loss. Proton pump inhibitors do not work for everyone. A physical reflux barrier (e.g., Gaviscon Liquid) may be more appropriate for some. Antisecretory medications (i.e., ulcers) can have several side effects.

When appropriate, anti-reflux surgery may benefit some individuals.

==== Inflammatory ====
When treating allergic laryngitis, topical nasal steroids and immunotherapy have been found effective for allergic rhinitis. Antihistamines may also be helpful, but can create a dryness in the larynx. Inhaled steroids that are used for a long period can lead to problems with the larynx and voice.

==== Autoimmune ====
Mucous membrane pemphigoid may be managed with medication (cyclophosphamide and prednisolone).

==== Granulomatous ====
Sarcoidosis is typically treated with systemic corticosteroids. Less frequently used treatments include intralesional injections or laser resection.

== Prognosis ==
=== Acute ===
Acute laryngitis may persist, but typically resolves on its own within 2 weeks. Recovery is likely to be quick if the patient follows the treatment plan. In viral laryngitis, symptoms can persist for an extended period, even when upper respiratory tract inflammation has been resolved.

=== Chronic ===
Laryngitis that continues for more than 3 weeks is considered chronic. If laryngeal symptoms last for more than 3 weeks, a referral to a physician should be made for further examination, including direct laryngoscopy. The prognosis for chronic laryngitis varies depending on the cause of the laryngitis.
