= Hoarse voice =

Voice disorder

- Other names: Hoarseness, dysphonia
- Specialty: Otolaryngology

A hoarse voice, also known as dysphonia or hoarseness, is when the voice involuntarily sounds breathy, raspy, or strained, or is softer in volume or lower in pitch. A hoarse voice can be associated with a feeling of unease or scratchiness in the throat. Hoarseness is often a symptom of problems in the vocal folds of the larynx. It may be caused by laryngitis, which in turn may be caused by an upper respiratory infection, a cold, or allergies. Cheering at sporting events, speaking loudly in noisy environments, talking for too long without resting one's voice, singing loudly, or speaking with a voice that is too high or too low can also cause temporary hoarseness. Smoking can also contribute to a hoarse voice. A number of other causes for losing one's voice exist, and treatment is generally by resting the voice and treating the underlying cause. If the cause is misuse or overuse of the voice, drinking plenty of water may alleviate the problems.

It appears to occur more commonly in females and the elderly. Furthermore, certain occupational groups, such as teachers and singers, are at an increased risk.

Long-term hoarseness, or hoarseness that persists over three weeks, especially when not associated with a cold or flu should be assessed by a medical doctor. It is also recommended to see a doctor if hoarseness is associated with coughing up blood, difficulties swallowing, a lump in the neck, pain when speaking or swallowing, difficulty breathing, or complete loss of voice for more than a few days. For voice to be classified as "dysphonic", abnormalities must be present in one or more vocal parameters: pitch, loudness, quality, or variability. Perceptually, dysphonia can be characterised by hoarse, breathy, harsh, or rough vocal qualities, but some kind of phonation remains.

Dysphonia can be categorized into two broad main types: organic and functional, and classification is based on the underlying pathology. While the causes of dysphonia can be divided into five basic categories, all of them result in an interruption of the ability of the vocal folds to vibrate normally during exhalation, which affects the voice. The assessment and diagnosis of dysphonia is done by a multidisciplinary team and involves the use of a variety of subjective and objective measures, which look at both the quality of the voice as well as the physical state of the larynx. Multiple treatments have been developed to address organic and functional causes of dysphonia. Dysphonia can be targeted through direct therapy, indirect therapy, medical treatments, and surgery. Functional dysphonias may be treated through direct and indirect voice therapies, whereas surgeries are recommended for chronic, organic dysphonias.

== Types ==
Voice disorders can be divided into two broad categories: organic and functional. The distinction between these broad classes stems from their cause, whereby organic dysphonia results from some sort of physiological change in one of the subsystems of speech (for voice, usually respiration, laryngeal anatomy, and/or other parts of the vocal tract are affected). Conversely, functional dysphonia refers to hoarseness resulting from vocal use (i.e. overuse/abuse). Furthermore, according to ASHA, organic dysphonia can be subdivided into structural and neurogenic; neurogenic dysphonia is defined as impaired functioning of the vocal structure due to a neurological problem (in the central nervous system or peripheral nervous system); in contrast, structural dysphonia is defined as impaired functioning of the vocal mechanism that is caused by some sort of physical change (e.g. a lesion on the vocal folds). Notably, an additional subcategory of functional dysphonia recognized by professionals is psychogenic dysphonia, which can be defined as a type of voice disorder that has no known cause and can be presumed to be a product of some sort of psychological stressors in one's environment. These types are not mutually exclusive and much overlap occurs. For example, Muscle Tension Dysphonia (MTD) has been found to be a result of many different causes including the following: MTD in the presence of an organic pathology (i.e. organic type), MTD stemming from vocal use (i.e. functional type), and MTD as a result of personality and/or psychological factors (i.e. psychogenic type).

- Organic dysphonia
  - Laryngitis (Acute: viral, bacterial) – (Chronic: smoking, GERD, LPR)
  - Neoplasm (Premalignant: dysplasia) – (Malignant: Squamous cell carcinoma)
  - Trauma (Iatrogenic: surgery, intubation) – (Accidental: blunt, penetrating, thermal)
  - Endocrine (Hypothyroidism, hypogonadism)
  - Haematological (Amyloidosis)
  - Iatrogenic (inhaled corticosteroids)
- Functional dysphonia
  - Psychogenic
  - Vocal misuse
  - Idiopathic

== Causes ==
The most common causes of hoarseness is laryngitis (acute 42.1%; chronic 9.7%) and functional dysphonia (30%). Hoarseness can also be caused by laryngeal tumours (benign 10.7–31%; malignant 2.2–3.0%). Causes that are overall less common include neurogenic conditions (2.8–8.0%), psychogenic conditions (2.0–2.2%), and aging (2%).Hoarseness can also be caused by Aortic arch aneurysm. Hoarseness due to aortic arch aneurysm is very rare, reported only in scattered case studies as part of Ortner's syndrome.

A variety of different causes, which result in abnormal vibrations of the vocal folds, can cause dysphonia. These causes can range from vocal abuse and misuse to systemic diseases. Causes of dysphonia can be divided into five basic categories, although overlap may occur between categories. (Note that this list is not exhaustive):

1. Neoplastic/structural: Abnormal growths of the vocal fold tissue.
  - Dysplasia
  - Cysts
  - Polyps
  - Nodules
  - Carcinoma
2. Inflammatory: Changes in the vocal fold tissue as a result of inflammation.
  - Allergy
  - Infections
  - Reflux
  - Smoking
  - Trauma
  - Voice abuse
3. Neuromuscular: Disturbances in any of the components of the nervous system that control laryngeal function.
  - Multiple Sclerosis
  - Myasthenia Gravis
  - Parkinson's disease
  - Spasmodic Dysphonia
  - Nerve injury
4. Associated Systemic Diseases: Systemic diseases which have manifestations that affect the voice.
  - Acromegaly
  - Amyloidosis
  - Hypothyroidism
  - Sarcoidosis
5. Technical: Associated with poor muscle functioning or psychological stresses, with no corresponding physiological abnormalities of the larynx.
  - Excess demands
  - Stress
  - Vocal strain

=== Employment ===
It has been suggested that certain occupational groups may be at increased risk of developing dysphonia due to the excessive or intense vocal demands of their work. Research on this topic has primarily focused on teachers and singers, although some studies have examined other groups of heavy voice users (e.g. actors, cheerleaders, aerobic instructors, etc.). At present, it is known that teachers and singers are likely to report dysphonia. Moreover, physical education teachers, teachers in noisy environments, and those who habitually use a loud speaking voice are at increased risk. The term clergyman's throat or dysphonia clericorum was previously used for painful dysphonia associated with public speaking, particularly among preachers. However, the exact prevalence rates for occupational voice users are unclear, as individual studies have varied widely in the methodologies used to obtain data (e.g. employing different operational definitions for "singer").

== Mechanism ==
Located in the anterior portion of the neck is the larynx (also known as the voice box), a structure made up of several supporting cartilages and ligaments, which houses the vocal folds. In normal voice production, exhaled air moves out of the lungs and passes upward through the vocal tract. At the level of the larynx, the exhaled air causes the vocal folds to move toward the midline of the tract (a process called adduction). The adducted vocal folds do not close completely but instead remain partially open. The narrow opening between the folds is referred to as the glottis. As air moves through the glottis, it causes a distortion of the air particles which sets the vocal folds into vibratory motion. It is this vibratory motion that produces phonation or voice. In dysphonia, there is an impairment in the ability to produce an appropriate level of phonation. More specifically, it results from an impairment in vocal fold vibration or the nerve supply of the larynx.

== Diagnosis ==
The assessment and diagnosis of a dysphonic voice is completed by a multidisciplinary team, such as an otolaryngologist (ear, nose and throat doctor) and a Speech-Language Pathologist, involving the use of both objective and subjective measures to evaluate the quality of the voice as well as the condition of the vocal fold tissue and vibration patterns.

=== Definition ===
Dysphonia is a broad clinical term that refers to abnormal functioning of the voice. More specifically, a voice can be classified as "dysphonic" when there are abnormalities or impairments in one or more of the following parameters of voice: pitch, loudness, quality, and variability. For example, abnormal pitch can be characterized by a voice that is too high or too low whereas abnormal loudness can be characterized by a voice that is too quiet or too loud. Similarly, a voice that has frequent, inappropriate breaks characterizes abnormal quality while a voice that is monotone (i.e., very flat) or inappropriately fluctuates characterizes abnormal variability. While hoarseness is used interchangeably with the term dysphonia, the two are not synonymous. Hoarseness is merely a subjective term to explain the perceptual quality (or sound) of a dysphonic voice. While hoarseness is a common symptom (or complaint) of dysphonia, there are several other signs and symptoms that can be present such as breathiness, roughness, and dryness. Furthermore, a voice can be classified as dysphonic when it poses problems in the functional or occupational needs of the individual or is inappropriate for their age or sex.

=== Auditory-perceptual measures ===
Auditory-perceptual measures are the most commonly used tool by clinicians to evaluate the voice quality due to its quick and non-invasive nature. Additionally, these measures have been proven to be reliable in a clinical setting. Ratings are used to evaluate the quality of a patient's voice for a variety of voice features, including overall severity, roughness, breathiness, strain, loudness and pitch. These evaluations are done during spontaneous speech, sentence or passage reading or sustained vowel productions. The GRBAS (Grade, Roughness, Breathiness, Asthenia, Strain) and the CAPE-V (Consensus Auditory Perceptual Evaluation—Voice) are two formal voice rating scales commonly used for this purpose.

=== Vocal fold imaging ===
Vocal fold imaging techniques are used by clinicians to examine the vocal folds and allows them to detect vocal pathology and assess the quality of the vocal fold vibrations. Laryngeal stroboscopy is the primary clinical tool used for this purpose. Laryngeal stroboscopy uses a synchronized flashing light passed through either a rigid or flexible laryngoscope to provide an image of the vocal fold motion; the image is created by averaging over several vibratory cycles and is thus not provided in real-time. As this technique relies on periodic vocal fold vibration, it cannot be used in patients with moderate to severe dysphonia. High speed digital imaging of the vocal folds (videokymography), another imaging technique, is not subject to the same limitations as laryngeal stroboscopy. A rigid endoscope is used to take images at a rate of 8000 frames per second, and the image is displayed in real time. As well, this technique allows imaging of aperiodic vibrations and can thus be used with patients presenting with all severities of dysphonia.

=== Acoustic measures ===
Acoustic measures can be used to provide objective measures of vocal function. Signal processing algorithms are applied to voice recordings made during sustained phonation or during spontaneous speech. The acoustic parameters which can then be examined include fundamental frequency, signal amplitude, jitter, shimmer, and noise-to-harmonic ratios. However, due to limitations imposed by the algorithms employed, these measures cannot be used with patients who exhibit severe dysphonia.

=== Aerodynamic measures ===
Aerodynamic measures of voice include measures of air volume, air flow and sub glottal air pressure. The normal aerodynamic parameters of voice vary considerably among individuals, which leads to a large overlapping range of values between dysphonic and non-dysphonic patients. This limits the use of these measures as a diagnostic tool. Nonetheless, they are useful when used in adjunct with other voice assessment measures, or as a tool for monitoring therapeutic effects over time.

== Prevention ==
Given that certain occupations are more at risk for developing dysphonia (e.g., teachers) research into prevention studies have been conducted. Research into the effectiveness of prevention strategies for dysphonia have yet to produce definitive results, however, research is still ongoing. Primarily, there are two types of vocal training recognized by professionals to help with prevention: direct and indirect. Direct prevention describes efforts to reduce conditions that may serve to increase vocal strain (such as patient education, relaxation strategies, etc.), while indirect prevention strategies refer to changes in the underlying physiological mechanism for voice production (e.g., adjustments to the manner in which vocal fold adduction occurs, respiratory training, shifting postural habits, etc.).

== Treatment ==
Although there is no universal classification of voice problems, voice disorders can be separated into certain categories: organic (structural or neurogenic), functional, neurological (psychogenic) or iatrogenic, for example. Depending on the diagnosis and severity of the voice problem, and depending on the category that the voice disorder falls into, various treatment methods can be suggested to the patient. The professional has to keep in mind that there is not one universal treatment, but rather the clinical approach must find what the optimal effective course of action for that particular patient is.

There are three main types of treatments: medical treatments, voice therapy and surgical treatments. When necessary, certain voice disorders use a combination of treatment approaches. A medical treatment involves the use of botulinum toxin (botox) or anti-reflux medicines, for example. Botox is a key treatment for voice disorders such as Spasmodic Dysphonia. Voice therapy is mainly used with patients who have an underlying cause of voice misuse or abuse. Laryngologists also recommend this type of treatment to patients who have an organic voice disorder - such as vocal fold nodules, cysts or polyps as well as to treat functional dysphonia. Certain surgical treatments can be implemented as well - phono microsurgery (removal of vocal fold lesions performed with a microscope), laryngeal framework surgery (the manipulation of the voice box), as well as injection augmentation (injection of substance to vocal folds to improve closure). Surgical treatments may be recommended for patients having an organic dysphonia.

A combination of both an indirect treatment method (an approach used to change external factors affecting the vocal folds) and a direct treatment method (an approach used where the mechanisms functioning during the use of the vocal folds, such as phonation or respiration, are the main focus) may be used to treat dysphonia.

=== Direct therapies ===
Direct therapies address the physical aspects of vocal production. Techniques work to either modify vocal fold contact, manage breathing patterns, and/or change the tension at the level of the larynx. Notable techniques include, but are not limited to, the yawn-sigh method, optimal pitch, laryngeal manipulation, humming, the accent method, and the Lee Silverman Voice Treatment. An example of a direct therapy is circumlaryngeal manual therapy, which has been used to reduce tension and massage hyoid-laryngeal muscles. This area is often tense from chronic elevation of the larynx. Pressure is applied to these areas as the patient hums or sustains a vowel. Traditional voice therapy is often used to treat muscular tension dysphonia.

=== Indirect therapies ===
Indirect therapies take into account external factors that may influence vocal production. This incorporates maintenance of vocal hygiene practices, as well as the prevention of harmful vocal behaviours. Vocal hygiene includes adequate hydration of the vocal folds, monitoring the amount of voice use and rest, avoidance of vocal abuse (e.g., shouting, clearing of the throat), and taking into consideration lifestyle choices that may affect vocal health (e.g., smoking, sleeping habits). Vocal warm-ups and cool-downs may be employed to improve muscle tension and decrease risk of injury before strenuous vocal activities. It should be taken into account that vocal hygiene practices alone are minimally effective in treating dysphonia, and thus should be paired with other therapies.

=== Medication and surgery ===
Medical and surgical treatments have been recommended to treat organic dysphonias. An effective treatment for spasmodic dysphonia (hoarseness resulting from periodic breaks in phonation due to hyperadduction of the vocal folds) is botulinum toxin injection. The toxin acts by blocking acetylcholine release at the thyro-arytenoid muscle. Although the use of botulinum toxin injections is considered relatively safe, patients' responses to treatment differ in the initial stages; some have reported experiencing swallowing problems and breathy voice quality as a side effect of the injections. Breathiness may last for a longer period of time for males than females.

Surgeries involve myoectomies of the laryngeal muscles to reduce voice breaks, and laryngoplasties, in which laryngeal cartilage is altered to reduce tension.

== Epidemiology ==
Dysphonia is a general term for voice impairment that is sometimes used synonymously with the perceptual voice quality of hoarseness. It is the reason for 1% of all visits to primary care providers. The lifetime risk of hoarse voice complaints among primary care patients is 30%. Since hoarseness is a general symptom, it is associated with a number of laryngeal diagnoses.

There is an interplay of sex and age differences associated with dysphonia. The point prevalence of dysphonia in adults under the age of 65 is 6.6%. Dysphonia is more common in adult females than males, possibly due to sex-related anatomical differences of the vocal mechanism. In childhood, however, dysphonia is more often found in boys than girls. As there are no anatomical differences in larynges of boys and girls prior to puberty, it has been proposed that the higher rate of voice impairment found in boys arises from louder social activities, personality factors, or more frequent inappropriate vocal use. The most common laryngeal diagnosis among children is vocal fold nodules, a condition known to be associated with vocally damaging behaviours. However, a causal relationship has not yet been definitively proven. The overall prevalence of dysphonia in children ranges from 3.9%–23.4%, most commonly affecting children between the ages of 8–14. Among the elderly, dysphonia is associated with both naturally occurring anatomical and physiological changes as well as higher rates of pathological conditions. The point prevalence of dysphonia among the elderly is 29%. Findings regarding the prevalence of geriatric dysphonia in the general population are very variable, ranging from 4–29.1%. This variability is likely due to different methodology used in obtaining information from participants. The most common laryngeal diagnoses among the elderly are polyps, laryngopharyngeal reflux, muscle tension dysphonia, vocal fold paresis or paralysis, vocal fold mass, glottic insufficiency, malignant lesions, and neurologic conditions affecting the larynx.
