= Spasmodic dysphonia =

Intermittent spasming of the vocal cords leading to irregular speech

- Other names: Laryngeal dystonia
- Specialty: Neurology
- Symptoms: Breaks in the voice making a person difficult to understand
- Complications: Depression, anxiety
- Usual onset: 30s to 50s
- Duration: Long term
- Types: Adductor, abductor, mixed
- Causes: Unknown
- Risk factors: Family history
- Diagnostic method: Examination by a team of healthcare providers
- Differential diagnosis: Stuttering, muscle tension dysphonia
- Treatment: Botulinum toxin into the affected muscles, voice therapy, counselling, amplification devices
- Frequency: 2 per 100,000

Spasmodic dysphonia

ꟿ

Spasmodic dysphonia (VoQS ꟿ), also known as laryngeal dystonia, is a disorder in which the muscles that generate a person's voice go into periods of spasm. This results in breaks or interruptions in the voice, often every few sentences, which can make a person difficult to understand. The person's voice may also sound strained or they may be nearly unable to speak. Onset is often gradual and the condition is lifelong.

The cause is unknown. Risk factors may include family history. Triggers may include an upper respiratory infection, injury to the larynx, overuse of the voice, and psychological stress. The underlying mechanism is believed to typically involve the central nervous system, specifically the basal ganglia. Diagnosis is typically made following examination by a team of healthcare providers. It is a type of focal dystonia.

While there is no cure, treatment may improve symptoms. Most commonly this involves injecting botulinum toxin into the affected muscles of the larynx. This generally results in improvement for a few months. Other measures include voice therapy, counselling, and amplification devices. If this is not effective, surgery may be considered; evidence to support surgery is limited, but some have recovered following surgery.

The disorder affects an estimated 2 per 100,000 people. Women are more commonly affected. Onset is typically between the ages of 30 and 50. Severity is variable between people. In some, work and social life are affected. Life expectancy is normal.

== Signs and symptoms ==
Symptoms of spasmodic dysphonia can come on suddenly or gradually appear over the span of years. They can come and go for hours or even weeks at a time, or remain consistent. Gradual onset can begin with the manifestation of a hoarse voice quality, which may later transform into a voice quality described as strained with breaks in phonation. These phonation breaks have been compared to stuttering in the past, but there is a lack of research in support of spasmodic dysphonia being classified as a fluency disorder. It is commonly reported by people with spasmodic dysphonia that symptoms almost only occur on vocal sounds that require phonation. Symptoms are less likely to occur at rest, while whispering, or on speech sounds that do not require phonation. It is hypothesized that this occurs because of an increase in sporadic, sudden, and prolonged tension found in the muscles around the larynx during phonation. This tension affects the abduction and adduction (opening and closing) of the vocal folds. Consequently, the vocal folds are unable to retain subglottal air pressure (required for phonation) and breaks in phonation can be heard throughout the speech of people with spasmodic dysphonia.

Regarding types of spasmodic dysphonia, the main characteristic of spasmodic dysphonia, breaks in phonation, is found along with other varying symptoms. The voice quality of adductor spasmodic dysphonia can be described as "strained-strangled" from tension in the glottal region. Voice quality for abductor spasmodic dysphonia can be described as breathy from variable widening of the glottal region. Vocal tremor may also be seen in spasmodic dysphonia. A mix and variance of these symptoms are found in mixed spasmodic dysphonia.

Symptoms of spasmodic dysphonia typically appear in middle-aged people, but have also been seen in people in their twenties, with symptoms emerging as young as teenage years.

== Cause ==
Normal functioning vocal folds

Although the exact cause of spasmodic dysphonia is still unknown, epidemiological, genetic, and neurological pathogenic factors have been proposed in recent research.

Risk factors include:

- Being female
- Being middle aged
- Having a family history of neurological diseases (e.g., tremor, dystonia, meningitis, and other neurological diseases)
- Stressful events
- Upper respiratory tract infections
- Sinus and throat illnesses
- Heavy voice use
- Cervical dystonia
- Childhood measles or mumps
- Pregnancy and parturition

It has not been established whether these factors directly affect the development of spasmodic dysphonia, but they could be used to identify at-risk patients.

Researchers have also explored the possibility of a genetic component to SD. Three genes have been identified that may be related to the development of focal or segmental dystonia: TUBB4A, THAP1, and TOR1A genes. However, a recent study that examined the mutation of these three genes in 86 SD patients found that only 2.3% of the patients had novel/rare variants in THAP1, but none in TUBB4A and TOR1A. Evidence of a genetic contribution for dystonia involving the larynx is still weak, and more research is needed in order to establish a causal relationship between SD and specific genes.

SD is a neurological disorder rather than a disorder of the larynx, and as in other forms of dystonia, interventions at the end organ (i.e., larynx) have not offered a definitive cure, only symptomatic relief. The pathophysiology underlying dystonia is becoming better understood as a result of discoveries about genetically based forms of the disorder, and this approach is the most promising avenue to a long-term solution.

SD is classified as a neurological disorder. However, because the voice can sound normal or near normal at times, some practitioners believe it to be psychogenic, originating in the affected person's mind rather than from a physical cause. This was especially true in the 19th and 20th centuries. No medical organizations or groups take this position. A comparison of SD patients compared with vocal fold paralysis (VFP) patients found that 41.7% of the SD patients met the DSM-IV criteria for psychiatric comorbidity compared with 19.5% of the VFP group. However, another study found the opposite, with SD patients having significantly less psychiatric comorbidity compared to VFP patients: "The prevalence of major psychiatric cases varied considerably among the groups, from a low of seven percent (1/14) for spasmodic dysphonia, to 29.4 percent (5/17) for functional dysphonia, to a high of 63.6 percent (7/11) for vocal cord paralysis." A review in the journal Swiss Medicine Weekly states that "Psychogenic causes, a 'psychological disequilibrium', and an increased tension of the laryngeal muscles are presumed to be one end of the spectrum of possible factors leading to the development of the disorder". Alternatively, many investigations into the condition feel that the psychiatric comorbidity associated with voice disorders is a result of the social isolation and anxiety that patients with these conditions feel as a consequence of their difficulty with speech, as opposed to the cause of their dysphonia. The opinion that SD is psychogenic is not upheld by experts in the scientific community.

SD is formally classified as a movement disorder; it is a type of focal dystonia known as laryngeal dystonia.

== Diagnosis ==
Diagnosis of spasmodic dysphonia requires a multidisciplinary team and consideration of both perceptual and physiological factors. There is currently no universally accepted diagnostic test for spasmodic dysphonia, which presents a challenge for diagnosis. Additionally, diagnostic criteria have not been agreed upon as the distinguishing features of this disorder have not been well-characterized.

A team of professionals including a speech–language pathologist, an otolaryngologist, and a neurologist, are typically involved in spasmodic dysphonia assessment and diagnosis. The speech–language pathologist conducts a speech assessment including case history questions to gather information about voice use and symptoms. This is followed by clinical observation and perceptual rating of voice characteristics such as voice breaks or strain, which are selectively present in normal speech over other voice activities such as whispering or laughing. Symptoms also vary across types of spasmodic dysphonia. For example, voiced sounds are more affected in adductor spasmodic dysphonia, while unvoiced sounds are more affected in abductor spasmodic dysphonia. Following the speech assessment, the otolaryngologist conducts a flexible transnasal laryngoscopy to view the vocal folds and activity of the muscles controlling them in order to eliminate other possible causes of the voice disorder. In spasmodic dysphonia, producing long vowels or speaking sentences results in muscle spasms that are not observed during other vocal activities such as coughing, breathing, or whispering. To evaluate the individual for any other neurological problems, this examination is followed up with an assessment by the neurologist.

=== Voice quality symbol ===
Spasmodic dysphonia

ꟿ

Encoding
- Entity (decimal): &#43007;
- Unicode (hex): U+A7FF

The voice quality symbol for spasmodic dysphonia is ꟿ.

=== Differential diagnosis ===
Because spasmodic dysphonia shares many characteristics with other voice disorders, misdiagnosis frequently occurs. A common misdiagnosis is muscle tension dysphonia, a functional voice disorder that results from use of the voice, rather than a structural abnormality. Some parameters can help guide the clinician towards a decision. In muscle tension dysphonia, the vocal folds are typically hyperadducted in a constant way, not in a spasmodic way. Additionally, the voice difficulties found in spasmodic dysphonia can be task specific, as opposed to those found in muscle tension dysphonia. Being able to differentiate between muscle tension dysphonia and spasmodic dysphonia is important because muscle tension dysphonia typically responds well to behavioral voice treatment, but spasmodic dysphonia does not. This is crucial to avoid providing inappropriate treatment, but in some cases, a trial of behavioral voice treatment can also be helpful to establish a differential diagnosis.

Spasmodic dysphonia can also be misdiagnosed as voice tremor. The movements that are found in this disorder are typically rhythmic in nature, as opposed to the muscle spasms of spasmodic dysphonia. Voice tremor and spasmodic dysphonia can co-occur in some patients.

Differential diagnosis is particularly important for determining appropriate interventions, as the type and cause of the disorder determine the most effective treatment. Differences in treatment effectiveness are present even between the types of spasmodic dysphonia. Diagnosis of spasmodic dysphonia is often delayed due to these challenges, which in turn presents difficulties in choosing the proper interventions.

=== Types ===
The three types of spasmodic dysphonia (SD) are adductor spasmodic dysphonia, abductor spasmodic dysphonia, and mixed spasmodic dysphonia. A fourth type called whispering dysphonia has also been proposed. Adductor spasmodic dysphonia is the most common type.

==== Adductor spasmodic dysphonia ====
Adductor spasmodic dysphonia (ADSD) is the most common type, affecting around 87% of individuals with SD. In ADSD, sudden involuntary muscle movements or spasms cause the vocal folds (or vocal cords) to squeeze together and stiffen. As the name suggests, these spasms occur in the adductor muscles of the vocal folds, specifically the thyroarytenoid and the lateral cricoarytenoid. These spasms make it difficult for the vocal folds to vibrate and produce voice. Words are often cut off or are difficult to start because of the muscle spasms. Therefore, speech may be choppy but differs from stuttering. The voice of an individual with adductor spasmodic dysphonia is commonly described as strained or strangled and full of effort. Surprisingly, the spasms are usually absent while laughing, speaking at a high pitch, or speaking while singing, but singers can experience a loss of range or the inability to produce certain notes of a scale or with projection. Stress often makes the muscle spasms more severe.

==== Abductor spasmodic dysphonia ====
Abductor spasmodic dysphonia (ABSD) is the second most common type, affecting around 13% of individuals with SD. In ABSD, sudden involuntary muscle movements or spasms cause the vocal folds to open. As the name suggests, these spasms occur in the single abductor muscle of the vocal folds, called the posterior cricoarytenoid. The vocal folds cannot vibrate when they are open. The open position of the vocal folds also allows air to escape from the lungs during speech. As a result, the voices of these individuals often sound weak, quiet, and breathy or whispery. As with adductor spasmodic dysphonia, the spasms are often absent during activities such as laughing or singing, but singers can experience a loss of range or the inability to produce certain notes of a scale or with projection.

==== Mixed spasmodic dysphonia ====
Mixed spasmodic dysphonia is the most rare type. Mixed spasmodic dysphonia involves both muscles that open the vocal folds and those that close them and, therefore, has features of both adductor and abductor spasmodic dysphonia. Some researchers believe that a subset of cases classified as mixed spasmodic dysphonia may actually be ADSD or ABSD subtype with the addition of compensatory voice behaviors that make it appear mixed. This further adds to the difficulty in achieving accurate diagnosis.

==== Whispering dysphonia ====
A fourth type has also been described. This appears to be caused by mutations in the TUBB4 gene on the short arm of chromosome 19 (19p13.2–p13.3). This gene encodes a tubulin gene. The pathophysiology of this condition has yet to be determined.

== Treatment ==
There are a number of potential treatments for spasmodic dysphonia, including Botox, voice therapy, and surgery. A number of medications have also been tried including anticholinergics (such as benztropine) which have been found to be effective in 40–50% of people, but which are associated with a number of side effects.

=== Botulinum toxin ===
Botulinum toxin (Botox) is often used to improve some symptoms of spasmodic dysphonia through weakening or paralyzing the vocal folds, thus preventing muscle spasms. The level of evidence for its use is currently limited; little is known about optimal dosage, frequency of injections, or exact location of injection. However, it remains a choice for many people due to the predictability and low chance of long term side effects. It results in periods of some improvement, with the duration of benefit lasting for 10–12 weeks on average before symptoms return to baseline. Repeat injection is required to sustain good vocal production, as results are only temporary. Some transient side effects observed in adductor spasmodic dysphonia include reduced speaking volume, difficulty swallowing, and a breathy and hoarse voice quality. While treatment outcomes are generally positive, it is presently unclear whether this treatment approach is more or less effective than others.

=== Voice therapy ===
Voice therapy appears to be ineffective in cases of true spasmodic dysphonia. However, as it is difficult to distinguish between spasmodic dysphonia and functional dysphonias, and misdiagnosis is relatively common, trial of voice therapy is often recommended before more invasive procedures are tried. Some also state that it is useful for mild symptoms and as an add-on to botox therapy and others report success in more severe cases. Laryngeal manual therapy, which is massaging of the neck and cervical structures, also shows positive results for intervention of functional dysphonia.

=== Surgery ===
If other measures are not effective, surgery may be considered; however, evidence to support surgery as a treatment for SD is limited. Treatment outcomes are generally positive, though more research is required to determine its effectiveness. Post-surgery voices can be imperfect and about 15% of people have significant difficulties. If symptoms do recur, this typically happens in the first 12 months. As of 2011, surgery was rarely used as a treatment approach for SD. Surgical approaches include recurrent laryngeal nerve resection, selective laryngeal adductor denervation-reinnervation (SLAD-R), thyroplasty, thyroarytenoid myectomy, and laryngeal nerve crush. Recurrent laryngeal nerve resection involves removing a section of the recurrent laryngeal nerve. Recurrent laryngeal nerve avulsion is a more drastic removal of sections of the nerve, and has positive outcomes of 80% at three years. SLAD-R is effective specifically for adductor spasmodic dysphonia, for which it has shown good outcomes in about 80% of people at 8 years. Thyroplasty changes the position or length of the vocal folds.

== History ==
In 1871, Ludwig Traube coined the term 'Spastic Dysphonia' while writing a description of a patient who suffered from a nervous hoarseness.

In 1895, Johann Schnitzler used the term "Spastic Aphonia", which is now called abductor SD, and "Phonic Laryngeal Spasms", now called adductor SD.

Hermann Nothnagel followed by calling the condition "Coordinated Laryngeal Spasms", while Fraenkel coined the term "Mogiphonia" as a slowly developing disorder of the voice, in which is characterized by the increasing of vocal fatigue, the spasmodic constriction of the thorat muscles, and pain around the larynx. A comparison was made to "mogigraphia", which we now know as "Writer's Cramp".

In 1899, William Gowers described functional laryngeal spasms whereby the vocal cords were brought together with too much force while speaking. This was contrasted to Phonic Paralysis, where the speaker's vocal chords could not be brought together during the action of speech. He reported in agreement with Fraenkel, that the vocal symptoms are most closely compared to Writers Cramp. Gowers reported and described a case by Gerhardt, where the patient had suffered from Writer's Cramp, and had learned to play the flute at the age of 50. Blowing the flute caused laryngeal spasms and a voice sound unintended by the patient, accompanied by contractions of the arm and mouth.

This disorder was termed "Spastic Dysphonia", and as it was not a disorder with spasticity, was renamed to what is now called, "Spasmodic Dysphonia", by Arnold Aronson in 1968.

In earlier works, Aronson performed Minnesota Multiphasic Personality Inventory screening and helped to establish SD as not being a Psychiatric Disorder, after reviewing psychiatric interviews of SD patients. Aronson formally characterized the two types of SD, the adductor, and abductor forms. Aronson described that adductor SD suffered from decreased loudness, and a mono-tonality, with a choked, strain-strangled voice quality. A vocal tremor was also often heard with a slowed speech rate. This was compared to what is seen in Essential Tremor.

Initial surgical efforts to treat the condition were published in 1976 by Herbert Dedo and involved cutting of the recurrent laryngeal nerve.

== Notable cases ==
- Scott Adams (1957-2026), creator of the comic strip Dilbert
- Johnny Bush, country and western musician and songwriter
- Keath Fraser, Canadian author who has documented the challenges and treatment of his condition in the book The Voice Gallery: Travels With a Glass Throat (2002)
- Chip Hanauer, American hydroplane racing driver
- Rodney Hicks, American Broadway, film, and TV performer
- Kaori, Japanese voice actor
- Robert F. Kennedy Jr., 26th Secretary of Health and Human Services
- Mary Lou Lord, indie folk musician
- Andy MacWilliams, radio broadcaster for the Cincinnati Stingers, Chicago Black Hawks, and Cincinnati Cyclones.
- Benny Martin (1928–2001), American bluegrass fiddler, affected from 1980 to 1997
- Darryl McDaniels of the rap group Run DMC
- Jenny Morris, New Zealand-born Australian pop, rock singer-songwriter
- Petra Pau, one of the vice-presidents of the German Bundestag.
- Jeff Pegues, Chief National Affairs and Justice Correspondent at CBS News
- Bonnie Petrie, American broadcast journalist and podcast host
- Diane Rehm, American public radio talk show host
- Aleesha Rome, causing her to quit her singing career.
- Jimmie Rodgers, Popular singer with his hits Honeycomb, Kisses Sweeter Than Wine, Secretly, etc.
- Gail Strickland, an American actress
- Mark Stuart, American Christian rock musician, of Audio Adrenaline
- Linda Thompson, British folk-rock musician
