= Index of linguistics articles =

Linguistics is the scientific study of human language. Someone who engages in this study is called a linguist.

== A ==
Abbreviation - Abessive case - Ablaut - Absolutive case - Abugida - Accusative case - Acute accent - Accent (phonetics) - Accent (sociolinguistics) - Acronym - Adessive case - Adjective - Adjunct - Adposition - Adpositional phrase - Adverb - Adverbial - Adverbial phrase - Affix - Affricate consonant - Agglutination - Agglutinative language - Allative case - Allomorph - Allophone - Alphabet - Analytic language - Anaphora - Animacy - Anthropological linguistics - Alveolar consonant - Antonym - Aorist - Applied linguistics - Approximant - Areal feature - Article - Articulatory gestures - Articulatory phonetics - Aspect - Asterisk - Attrition - Attraction - Augment (Bantu languages) - Augment (Indo-European) - Auxiliary verb

== B ==
Back-formation - Backronym - Bilabial consonant - Breathy voice - Breve

== C ==
Calque - Capitalization - Capitonym - Cardinal vowel - Case - Case in tiers - Cedilla - Chiasmus - Circumfix - Circumflex - Clefting - Click consonant - Closed-class word - Cognate - Cognitive science - Coherence - Colloquialism - Comitative case - Comparative - Comparative linguistics - Comparative method - Compound noun and adjective - Compound verb - Computer-assisted language learning - Computational linguistics - Conjugation - Conjunct - Conjunction - Consonant - Constructed language - Context - Contrastive analysis - Contrastive linguistics - Conversation analysis - Copula - Corpus linguistics - Cranberry morpheme - Creaky voice - Creole language - Cryptanalysis - Cuneiform

== D ==
Dangling modifier - Dative case - Decipherment - Declension - Defective verb - Descriptive linguistics - Dental consonant - Derivation - Determiner - Diacritic - Diaeresis - Dialect - Dictionary - Diphthong - Diplomatics - Discourse - Disjunct - Dislocation - Double acute accent - Dual grammatical number

== E ==
Eggcorn - Ecolinguistics - Elative case - Endangered language - English pronunciation - Entailment - Ergative case - Error - Essive case - Ethnologue - Etymology - Etymologist - Eurolinguistics - Evolution of languages - Evolutionary linguistics - Example-based machine translation - Exegesis - Expletive - Expletive attributive

== F ==
False cognate - False friend - Figleaf- Formal language - Fricative consonant - Function word - Fusional language - Future perfect - Future tense

== G ==
Gender - General semantics - Genitive case - Germanic umlaut - Gerund - Glottal consonant - Glottal stop - Glottochronology - Government - Grammar - Grammatical gender - Grammatical mood - Grammatical number - Grammatical voice - Grave accent - Great consonant shift - Great Vowel Shift - Grimm's law - Guttural consonant

== H ==
Hacek - Heaps' law - Hermeneutics - Hiatus (linguistics) - High rising terminal - Historical-comparative linguistics - Historical linguistics - History of linguistics - Homonym - Hypernym - Hyponym

== I ==
I-mutation - Ideogram - Idiolect - Idiom - Illative case - Impersonal pronoun - Impersonal verb - Implication (pragmatics) - Indo-European languages - Inessive case - Infinitive - Infix - Inflected language - Inflection - Initialism - Initial-stress-derived noun - Instructive case - Interjection - Interactional linguistics - International Phonetic Alphabet - IPA chart for English - Irregular verb

== L ==
Labiodental consonant - Langue and parole - Language - Language acquisition - Language attrition - Language education - Language families and languages - Language game - The Language Instinct - Language isolate - Laryngeal theory - Lateral consonant - Lemma - Lexeme - Lexical semantics - Lexicography - Lexicology - Lexicon - Linguist - Linguistic anthropology - Linguistic ecology - Linguistic layers - Linguistic relativity - Linguistics - Linguistics basic topics - Liquid consonant - List of linguists - Loanword - Locative case

== M ==
Machine translation - macron - Manner of articulation - Mass noun - Mathematical linguistics - Meaning - Meronymy - Metathesis - Minimal pair - Mispronunciation - Modality - Mood - Mora - Morpheme - Morphology - Mutual intelligibility

== N ==
Nasal consonant - Nasal stop - Natural language - Natural language processing - Natural language understanding - Negative raising - Neologism - Neurolinguistics - Nomenclature - Nominative case - Noun - Noun phrase - Null morpheme

== O ==
Onomasiology - Onomatopoeia - Open class word - Optimality theory - Origin of language - Orthography - Object–subject–verb - Object–verb–subject - Oxytone

== P ==
Palatal consonant - Paradigm - Paroxytone - Part of speech - Participle - Particle - Partitive case - Past tense - Perfect (grammar) - Persuasion - Pharyngeal consonant - Philology - Philosophy of language - Phonation - Phone - Phonetics - Phonetic complement - Phonetic transcription - Phonology - Phoneme - Phonemics - Phrase - Phrase structure rules - Pidgin - Place of articulation - Pleonasm - Pluperfect - Polysemy - Polysynthetic language - Portmanteau - Possessive case - Postalveolar consonant - Postposition - Pragmatics - Prefix - Preposition - Prepositional phrase - Prescription and description - Present tense - Presupposition - Preterite - Principles of interpretation - Profanity - Prolative case - Pronoun - Pronunciation - Prosody (linguistics) - Proparoxytone - Pseudo-acronym - Pseudo-Anglicism - Psycholinguistics - Punctuation

== Q ==
Quirky subject

== R ==
Radical - Retroflex consonant - Retronym - Rhetoric - Rhotics - Romanization - Rounded vowel

== S ==
SAMPA - Schwa - Second language - Semantics - Semantic class - Semantic feature - Semantic property - Semiotics - Semivowel - Sentence - Sentence function - Shall - Sign - Sign language - Sociolinguistics - Sociolect - Sociophonetics - Slack voice - Slang - Sound change - Sound pattern of English - SOV - Speaker recognition - Specialised lexicography - Speech communication - Speech act - Speech disorder - Speech processing - Speech recognition - Speech synthesis - Speech therapy - Spiritus asper - Split infinitive - Standard language - Stop consonant - Stratificational linguistics - String grammar - Structuralism - Stylistics - Subcategorization - Superlative - Suppletion - Subject - SVO - Supine - Syllabary - Syllable - Synonym - Syntactic ambiguity - Syntactic categories - Syntax - Synthetic language

== T ==
Tagmemics - Telicity - Tense - Tense–aspect–mood - Terminology - Text linguistics - Text types - Thematic role - Theoretical linguistics - Thesaurus - Thou - Time–manner–place - Tonal language - Tone (linguistics) - Tongue-twister - Transcription - Transformational-generative grammar - Translation - Translative case - Truth condition - T–V distinction - Typology

== U ==
Uninflected word - Universal grammar - Uvular consonant

== V ==
V2 word order - Variety - Velar consonant - Verb - Verb–object–subject - Verb phrase - Verb–subject–object - Verbal noun - Verner's law - Vocative case - Vowel - Vowel harmony - Vowel stems -

== W ==
Weak suppletion - Will (verb) - Word - Word-sense disambiguation - Writing - Writing systems - Wug test

== X ==
X-bar theory

== Z ==
Zipf's law
