= Exie E. Welsch =

American psychiatrist (1908–1980)

Exie E. Welsch (1908–1980) was an American psychiatrist specializing in child psychiatry. She was the first woman elected president of the American Orthopsychiatric Association.

== Biography ==
Welsch was born in 1908. She graduated from the Indiana University School of Medicine and completed specialty training under Adolph Meyer at Johns Hopkins University’s Phipps Psychiatric Clinic. She practiced psychiatry in Manhattan for 35 years and held academic positions at New York Hospital, New York Medical College, and Columbia University. She was board-certified in neurology, psychiatry, and child psychiatry, and served as an examiner for child psychiatry certification. During the war years, Welsch moved to up-state New York to head the Rochester Guidance Center, one of the earliest multidisciplinary child guidance clinics.

In her 1956 presidential address to the American Orthopsychiatric Association, Welsch advocated a broader medical perspective on mental illness that included neurological, physiological, and environmental considerations, contrasting with traditional psychoanalytic views.

After undergoing a laryngectomy in 1974, Welsch learned esophageal speech, resumed medical practice, and co-founded the Organization for Women With Laryngectomies (OWLS). She died of cancer at age 72.
