= Voice Quality Symbols =

Phonetic symbols used to transcribe disordered speech

Chart of the Voice Quality Symbols, as of 2016

Voice Quality Symbols (VoQS) are a set of phonetic symbols used to transcribe disordered speech for what in speech pathology is known as "voice quality". This phrase is usually synonymous with phonation in phonetics, but in speech pathology encompasses secondary articulation as well.

VoQS are normally combined with curly braces that span a section of speech, just as with prosody notation in the extended IPA (extIPA). In fact, they started off as part of extIPA before being split off. The symbols may be modified with a digit to convey relative degree of the quality. For example, ⟨V!⟩ is used for harsh voice, and {3V! ... 3V!} indicates that the intervening speech is very harsh. ⟨L̞⟩ indicates a lowered larynx. Thus, {L̞1V! ... 1V!L̞} indicates that the intervening speech is less harsh with a lowered larynx.

VoQS use mostly IPA or extended IPA diacritics on capital letters for the element being modified: V for 'voice'/articulation, L for 'larynx', and J for 'jaw'. Degree is marked 1 for slight, 2 for moderate, and 3 for extreme.

== Symbols ==
The following combinations of letters and diacritics are used. They indicate an airstream mechanism, phonation or secondary articulation across a stretch of speech. For example, 'palatalized voice' indicates palatalization of all segments of speech spanned by the braces.

Several of these symbols may be profitably used as part of single speech sounds, in addition to indicating voice qualities across spans of speech. For example, [ↀ͡r̪͆ː] is blowing a raspberry. [ɬ↓ʔ] is the ⟨l*⟩ sound in Damin while [{↓ ... ↓}] is a string of ingressive speech.

=== Airstream mechanisms ===
The airstream mechanism is the process for generating the flow of air required for speech.

- {ↀ} buccal speech (symbol is iconic for the pockets of air in the cheeks)
- {Œ} œsophageal speech (symbol derives from the letter œ of œsophagus)
- {Ю} tracheo-œsophageal speech (symbol attempts to capture iconically the dual nature of the airstream)
- {↓} pulmonic ingressive speech

=== Phonation types ===
The four primary phonation types, other than voiceless, each receive a distinct letter:

{V} modal voice
{F} falsetto
{W} whisper (Typically only the normally modally voiced segments are whispery, while the voiceless segments remain voiceless. Note that this "whisper" is distinct from the "whispery voice" below.)
{C} creak

These letters conflict with the common use of C, V and F as wildcards for consonant, vowel and fricative in IPA-based text. Other, non-conflicting conventions are available, such as % for creak and ¤ for whisper in discourse transcription.

Modifications are made with diacritics. The terms "whispery voice" and "breathy voice" follow Catford (1977) and differ from the vocabulary of the IPA, with VoQS "whispery voice" being equivalent to IPA "breathy voice" / "murmur". The notations {Ṿ} and {V̤} are therefore often confused, and {V̤} should perhaps be used for VoQS "whispery voice" with e.g. {Vʱ} for VoQS "breathy voice".

{Ṿ} whispery voice (murmur; the breathy voice of the IPA)
{V̰} creaky voice
{V̤} breathy voice
{C̣} whispery creak
{F̰} creaky falsetto
{V͉} slack/lax voice
{V!} harsh voice (without ventricular vibration; this may differ from the use of the word "harsh" cross-linguistically, which may be the same as "ventricular", next)
{V̰!} harsh creaky voice
{C!} harsh creak
{V‼} ventricular phonation
{V̬‼} diplophonia (simultaneous ventricular and glottal vibration; see also vocal-fold cyst)
{Ṿ‼} whispery ventricular phonation
{V𐞀} aryepiglottic phonation
{V͈} pressed phonation/tight voice (made by pressing together the arytenoid cartilages so that only the anterior ligamental vocal folds vibrate; the opposite of whisper, where the vibration is posterior)
{W͈} tight whisper
{ꟿ} spasmodic dysphonia
{И} electrolaryngeal phonation (approximates symbol for electricity)
{L̝} raised larynx
{L̞} lowered larynx
{Vꟸ} faucalized voice (iconic of narrowing of faucial pillars)
{(V)} zero airstream

=== Secondary articulation ===
These settings involve secondary articulation, usually in addition to any articulation that would be expected for non-pathological speech. They are called voices because they affect the sound quality of the utterance (that is, the individual's human voice), though this usage contradicts the IPA use of the word "voice" for voicing. For illustration here, diacritics are combined with the letter 'V' for modal voice, as that is the default assumption. (They could also be combined with F, W, C, etc.)

{Vꟹ} labialized (open rounded; that is, [◌ʷ̜ ])
{Vʷ} labialized (close rounded)
{V͍} spread-lip
{Vᶹ} labio-dentalized
{V̺} linguo-apicalized
{V̻} linguo-laminalized
{V˞} retroflex
{V̪} dentalized (diacritic iconic for a tooth)
{V͇} alveolarized (diacritic iconic for the alveolar ridge)
{V͇ʲ} palatoalveolarized
{Vʲ} palatalized
{Vˠ} velarized
{Vʶ} uvularized (self-evident extension of IPA usage)
{Vˤ} pharyngealized
{V̙ˤ} laryngo-pharyngealized
{Ṽ} nasalized
{V͊} denasalized
{J̞} open jaw (that is, more than the norm)
{J̝} close jaw (more than the norm)
{J͔} right-offset jaw
{J͕} left-offset jaw
{J̟} protruded jaw
{Θ} protruded tongue (protrusion of the tip or blade of the tongue to an interdental position for extended periods)

=== Compound notation ===
Combinations of symbols are also used, such as {Ṿ̃} for nasal whispery voice, {WF̰} for whispery creaky falsetto, or {V͋‼} for ventricular phonation with nasal lisp. If the number of diacritics on a letter becomes excessive, the notation may be broken up. For example, {Ṿ̰̃ˠ} may be replaced with {VˠṼṾV̰}.

== Chart ==
The full table of provided symbols, as it appears in the 2016 chart, is as follows (the 'Supralaryngeal Settings' have been split into their respective sections):

Airstream Types
ↀ buccal airstream		↓ pulmonic ingressive speech	
Œ œsophageal airstream		Ю tracheo-œsophageal speech	
Phonation Types
V modal voice	F falsetto	W whisper	C creak
Ṿ whispery voice	V̰ creaky voice	V̤ breathy voice	V! harsh voice
F̣ whispery falsetto	F̰ creaky falsetto	F! harsh falsetto	C! harsh creak
Ṿ! harsh whispery voice		V̰! harsh creaky voice	
V̰̣ whispery creaky voice		V̰̣! harsh whispery creaky voice	
F̰̣ whispery creaky falsetto		F̰̣! harsh whispery creaky falsetto	
V͉ slack/lax voice		V͈ pressed phonation / tight voice	
V‼ ventricular phonation		V̬‼ diplophonia	
Ṿ‼ whispery ventricular phonation		V𐞀 aryepiglottic phonation	
ꟿ spasmodic dysphonia		И electrolarynx phonation	
Larynx Height
L̝ raised larynx-voice		L̞ lowered larynx-voice	
Labial Settings
Vꟹ labialized voice (open rounded)		Vʷ labialized voice (close rounded)	
V͍ spread-lip voice		Vᶹ labio-dentalized voice	
Lingual Settings
V̺ linguo-apicalized voice		V̻ linguo-laminalized voice	
V˞ retroflex voice		V̪ dentalized voice	
V͇ alveolarized voice		V͇ʲ palato-alveolarized voice	
Vʲ palatalized voice		Vˠ velarized voice	
Vʶ uvularized voice		Vˁ pharyngealized voice	
V̙ˤ laryngo-pharyngealized voice		Vꟸ faucalized voice	
State of the Velum
Ṽ nasalized voice		V͊ denasalized voice	
Jaw and Tongue Settings
J̞ open-jaw voice		J̝ close-jaw voice	
J͔ right offset-jaw voice		J͕ left offset-jaw voice	
J̟ protruded-jaw voice		Θ protruded-tongue voice	

== See also ==
- Extensions to the International Phonetic Alphabet
- International Phonetic Alphabet

Place →	Labial					Coronal										Dorsal					Laryngeal			
Manner ↓	Bilabial		Labiodental		Linguolabial		Dental		Alveolar		Postalveolar		Retroflex		(Alveolo-)palatal		Velar		Uvular		Pharyngeal/epiglottal		Glottal	
Nasal	m̥	m	ɱ̊	ɱ		n̼	n̪̊	n̪	n̥	n	n̠̊	n̠	ɳ̊	ɳ	ɲ̊	ɲ	ŋ̊	ŋ	ɴ̥	ɴ				
Plosive	p	b	p̪	b̪	t̼	d̼	t̪	d̪	t	d			ʈ	ɖ	c	ɟ	k	ɡ	q	ɢ	ʡ		ʔ	
Sibilant affricate							t̪s̪	d̪z̪	ts	dz	t̠ʃ	d̠ʒ	tʂ	dʐ	tɕ	dʑ								
Non-sibilant affricate	pɸ	bβ	p̪f	b̪v			t̪θ	d̪ð	tɹ̝̊	dɹ̝	t̠ɹ̠̊˔	d̠ɹ̠˔			cç	ɟʝ	kx	ɡɣ	qχ	ɢʁ	ʡʜ	ʡʢ	ʔh	
Sibilant fricative							s̪	z̪	s	z	ʃ	ʒ	ʂ	ʐ	ɕ	ʑ								
Non-sibilant fricative	ɸ	β	f	v	θ̼	ð̼	θ	ð	θ̠	ð̠	ɹ̠̊˔	ɹ̠˔	ɻ̊˔	ɻ˔	ç	ʝ	x	ɣ	χ	ʁ	ħ	ʕ	h	ɦ
Approximant		β̞		ʋ				ð̞		ɹ		ɹ̠		ɻ		j		ɰ						˷
Tap/flap		ⱱ̟		ⱱ					ɾ̥	ɾ			ɽ̊	ɽ						ɢ̆		ʡ̆		
Trill	ʙ̥	ʙ							r̥	r		r̠	ɽ̊r̥	ɽr					ʀ̥	ʀ	ʜ	ʢ		
Lateral affricate									tɬ	dɮ			tꞎ	d𝼅	c𝼆	ɟʎ̝	k𝼄	ɡʟ̝						
Lateral fricative							ɬ̪		ɬ	ɮ			ꞎ	𝼅	𝼆	ʎ̝	𝼄	ʟ̝						
Lateral approximant								l̪	l̥	l		l̠	ɭ̊	ɭ	ʎ̥	ʎ	ʟ̥	ʟ		ʟ̠				
Lateral tap/flap									ɺ̥	ɺ			𝼈̊	𝼈		ʎ̆		ʟ̆						

		BL	LD	D	A	PA	RF	P	V	U
Implosive	Voiced	ɓ			ɗ		ᶑ	ʄ	ɠ	ʛ
Implosive	Voiceless	ɓ̥			ɗ̥		ᶑ̊	ʄ̊	ɠ̊	ʛ̥
Ejective	Stop	pʼ			tʼ		ʈʼ	cʼ	kʼ	qʼ
Ejective	Affricate		p̪fʼ	tθʼ	tsʼ	tʃʼ	tʂʼ	tɕʼ	kxʼ	qχʼ
Ejective	Fricative	ɸʼ	fʼ	θʼ	sʼ	ʃʼ	ʂʼ	ɕʼ	xʼ	χʼ
Ejective	Lateral affricate				tɬʼ			c𝼆ʼ	k𝼄ʼ	q𝼄ʼ
Ejective	Lateral fricative				ɬʼ					
Click (top: velar; bottom: uvular)	Tenuis	kʘ qʘ		kǀ qǀ	kǃ qǃ		k𝼊 q𝼊	kǂ qǂ		
Click (top: velar; bottom: uvular)	Voiced	ɡʘ ɢʘ		ɡǀ ɢǀ	ɡǃ ɢǃ		ɡ𝼊 ɢ𝼊	ɡǂ ɢǂ		
Click (top: velar; bottom: uvular)	Nasal	ŋʘ ɴʘ		ŋǀ ɴǀ	ŋǃ ɴǃ		ŋ𝼊 ɴ𝼊	ŋǂ ɴǂ	ʞ	
Click (top: velar; bottom: uvular)	Tenuis lateral				kǁ qǁ					
Click (top: velar; bottom: uvular)	Voiced lateral				ɡǁ ɢǁ					
Click (top: velar; bottom: uvular)	Nasal lateral				ŋǁ ɴǁ					
