= Donald Duck talk =

Alaryngeal form of vocalization

Buccal speech is an alaryngeal form of vocalization which uses the inner cheek to produce sound rather than the larynx. The speech is also known as Donald Duck talk, after the Disney character Donald Duck.

== Production ==
The buccal speech symbol

Buccal speech is created with one of the buccal or cheek sides of the vocal tract. Both the air chamber and the replacement glottis are formed between the cheek and upper jaw. Buccal speech is produced when a person creates an air-bubble between the cheek and the jaw on one side and then uses muscular action to drive the air through a small gap between or behind the teeth into the mouth. The sound so produced makes a high rough sound. This then is articulated to make speech. The speech sounds made in this way are difficult to hear and have a raised pitch. The technique can also be used to sing, and is usually acquired as a taught or self-learned skill and used for entertainment.

== Other cases ==
- Donald Duck–like speech is described to occur after pseudobulbar dysarthria in which speech gains a high-pitched "strangulated" quality.
- Donald Duck speech effect is described (usually as an undesired phenomenon) in audio engineering when speech is time compressed, rate controlled, or accelerated.
- The term is sometimes also used to refer to the frequency-shifted speech from an improperly tuned single-sideband modulation (SSB) radiotelephone receiver, or the (nearly unintelligible) sound of a SSB signal on a conventional amplitude modulation (AM) receiver.
- A high pitched nasal voice resembling Donald Duck is sometimes noted in individuals with Prader-Willi syndrome.

== See also ==
- Disco Duck
- Esophageal speech
- Phonation
- Vocal extended technique
- Overtone singing
- Ventriloquism
- Beatboxing
- Circular breathing
- Whistling
- Yakky Doodle
