= Jiangshan dialect =

Southern Wu dialect spoken in China

- 江山話
- Native to: China
- Region: Jiangshan city, Quzhou prefecture, Zhejiang province
- Native speakers: (undated figure of 500,000–600,000)
- Language family: Sino-Tibetan: Sinitic; Wu; Chuqu; Jiangshan dialect

Language codes
- ISO 639-3: –
- Glottolog: long1386 Jiangshan

The Jiangshan dialect (江山話) is a Southern Wu dialect, closely related to that of Quzhou. It is spoken in Jiangshan, a city in Quzhou prefecture, China.

== Phonology ==
=== Initials ===
		Labial	Dental	Palatal	Velar	Glottal
Nasal		m 馬	n 腦		ŋ 我	
Plosive	tenuis	p 巴	t 豬		k 姜	
Plosive	aspirated	pʰ 怕	tʰ 聽		kʰ 氣	
Plosive	slack voice	b̥ 爬	d̥ 同		ɡ̊ 群	
Affricate	tenuis		ts 再	tɕ 朱		
Affricate	aspirated		tsʰ 寸	tɕʰ 唱		
Affricate	slack voice		d̥z̥ 茶	d̥ʑ̊ 傳		
Fricative	tenuis	f 夫	s 山	ɕ 心		h 曉
Fricative	slack voice	v̥ 浮	z̥ 事	ʑ̊ 樹		ɦ 雲
Approximant			l 李			

=== Finals ===
耳 [ør]	衣 [ɦi]	无 [vu]	雨 [ɦy]	之 [tsɿ]
拉 [lɑ]	家 [kiɑ]	瓦 [ŋuɑ]		
鞋 [ɦæ]	也 [ɦiæ]	快 [kʰuæ]		
天 [tʰiɛ̃]		全 [ʑyɛ̃]		
开 [kʰe]		会 [kue]		
哥 [ko]				
包 [pɐɯ]	表 [piɐɯ]			
楼 [lɯ]	秋 [tɕʰiɯ]			
三 [sã]	香 [hiã]	关 [kuã]		
干 [kɔ̃]	状 [ʑiɔ̃]			
盘 [bɐ̃]	官 [kuɐ̃]			
门 [mõ]	穷 [ɡiõ]			
齿 [tsʰɿə]	鱼 [ŋɯə]			
金 [kœ̃]		森 [ɕyœ̃]		
京 [kĩ]		春 [tɕʰỹ]		
八 [paʔ]	学 [ɦiaʔ]	扩 [kʰuaʔ]		
笔 [pœʔ]		十 [ʑyœʔ]		
日 [nəʔ]	习 [ʑiɛʔ]		越 [ɦyɛʔ]	
月 [ŋoʔ]	肉 [ʑioʔ]			
合 [kɔʔ]		肉 [ŋyɔʔ]		

=== Tones ===
The Jiangshan dialect is considered to have eight tones. However, since tone split from Middle Chinese, each character still depends on the voicing of the initial consonant. These constitute just three phonemic tones: pin, shang, and qu. (Ru syllables are phonemically toneless, as their distinctiveness lies in a final glottal stop.)

Tone chart of Jiangshan dialect
Number	Tone name	Tone contour	Examples
1	陰平 yīn píng	˦ (44)	天空飛山
2	陽平 yáng píng	˨˧˩ (231)	南來田皮
3	陰上 yīn shàng	˧˨˦ (324)	紙九火口
4	陽上 yáng shàng	˨ (22)	坐買有被
5	陰去 yīn qù	˥˩ (51)	菜四送去
6	陽去 yáng qù	˧˩ (31)	備洞路硬
7	陰入 yīn rù	˦˥ʔ (45)	七雪踢客
8	陽入 yáng rù	˩˨ʔ (12)	六肉白獨
