= Heat and moisture exchanger after laryngectomy =

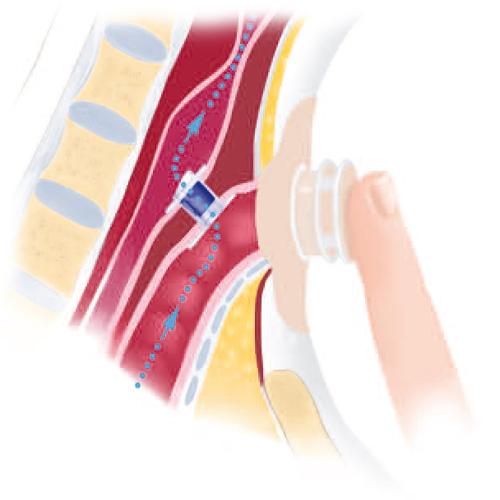
Heat and Moisture Exchanger (HME)

Heat and moisture exchangers (HME) are used after laryngectomy to help reduce breathing restrictions and compensate nasal functions.

== Procedure ==
During a total laryngectomy, the entire voicebox (larynx) is removed, which leads to a permanent disconnection of the upper and lower airways and a permanent tracheostoma (a breathing hole in the neck). Prior to the operation, breathing primarily occurs through the nasal airways. In the upper airways, the inhaled air is warmed up or cooled down, to prepare the optimal temperature before the air reaches the lungs. After a total laryngectomy, the upper airways are bypassed and breathing in and out occurs through the tracheostoma in the neck which means that the inhaled air flows directly into the lungs. These anatomical changes lead, among others, to changes in voice production, breathing, and olfaction. The nasal functions of regulating the temperature, humidifying, and filtering of the inhaled air are lost. The lack of these functions impairs the lower airways and the activity of the cilia, which leads to pulmonary problems such as tracheobronchial mucus, excessive sputum production, crusting, which can also cause fatigue and shortness of breath. To at least partially reduce these restrictions and compensate the nasal functions, an HME cassette can be attached over the tracheostoma to provide a means for conditioning, humidifying and to a certain extent filtering the inhaled air.

== Pulmonary function rehabilitation ==
With the regular use of an HME cassette over a couple of weeks, the pulmonary functions can be significantly improved in the majority of patients regarding reduced sputum production, reduced forced expectoration in order to clear the airways, and thereby reduced stoma cleaning. This is due to improved ventilation and blood oxygenation values, which leads to a better ciliary activity and thus more efficient coughing for mucus clearance from the trachea. Studies show that with regular and enduring use of an HME cassette, pulmonary complaints decrease, regardless of country and climate. These improvements can affect voice pitch, loudness and intelligibility, and on sleeping disorders and fatigue, which is often related to pulmonary problems.

== Attachment ==
HME devices can be attached to the tracheostoma in two different ways: peristomally, by use of a base plate, to which the HME can be attached, and intraluminally, by putting the HME into a laryngectomy tube or a stoma button. Adhesive baseplates come in different shapes and properties to meet the users’ differences in anatomy and skin types.

Peristomally through an adhesive on the neck surrounding the stoma There is a variety of adhesive baseplates, that can be used to attach the HME and products that are recommended for proper application and removal of the adhesive complement the portfolio.

Intraluminally through a device that is inserted into the tracheostoma Some laryngectomized patients require a laryngectomy tube to maintain stoma patency, especially in the early postsurgical days and during postoperative radiotherapy. A stoma button is primarily used in stomas that are shrinking. This is the preferred solution for many users, but there has to be a tight lip that holds the button in place.

== Device lifetime ==
Most patients use one adhesive per day and 1-2 HME cassettes per day.

== Voice prosthesis and HME ==
An individual combination of voice prosthesis, HME, and attachment is important for good speech and pulmonary rehabilitation.
