= Voice training =

Voice training may consist of professional training in any of the following fields:

- Vocal pedagogy for singing, particularly opera
- Debate
- Public speaking
- Voice acting
  - Dubbing (filmmaking)
  - Dialect training for actors who need to speak in a particular dialect or accent
- Training for TV or radio announcers

It may also refer to voice therapy, which is primarily used to aid in the management of voice disorders, or for altering the overall quality of voice, as in the case of transgender voice therapy.

Professions that practice voice training include:

- Vocal coach
- Voice teacher
- Dialect coach
