= Voice prosthesis =

Device allowing speech after laryngectomy

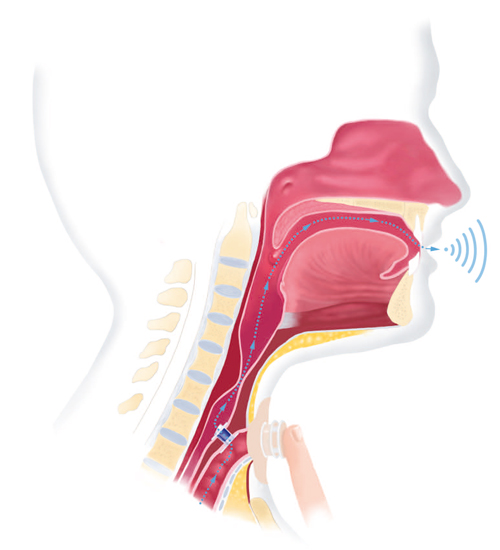
Voice prosthesis

A voice prosthesis (plural prostheses) is an artificial device, usually made of silicone that is used in conjunction with voice therapy to help laryngectomized patients to speak. During a total laryngectomy, the entire voice box (larynx) is removed and the windpipe (trachea) and food pipe (esophagus) are separated from each other. During this operation an opening between the food pipe and the windpipe can be created (primary puncture). This opening can also be created at a later time (secondary puncture). This opening is called a tracheo-esophageal puncture (TE puncture). The voice prosthesis is placed in this opening. Then, it becomes possible to speak by occluding the stoma and blowing the air from the lungs through the inside of the voice prosthesis and through the throat, creating a voice sound, which is called tracheo-esophageal speech. The back end of the prosthesis sits at the food pipe. To avoid food, drinks, or saliva from coming through the prosthesis and into the lungs, the prosthesis has a small flap at the back. There are two ways of inserting the voice prosthesis: through the mouth and throat (retrograde manner) with the help of a guide wire, or directly through the tracheostoma (anterograde) manner. Nowadays, most voice prosthesis are placed anterograde, through the stoma.

== History ==
There are two lines of development in support of giving a voice to patients being laryngectomized.

=== Artificial larynx ===
In 1869, the first artificial voice box (larynx) was built by Czermak. In 1873 Theodor Billroth made a total laryngectomy (in steps) and implanted an artificial voice box. A new development, using modern materials, took place in France by Debry.

=== Voice prosthesis ===
In 1972, the very first voice prosthesis for voice rehabilitation after total laryngectomy was described in an article in Polish by Mozolewski. Since then, many efforts have taken place in this area of rehabilitation. There are several manufacturers that have voice prosthesis in their product portfolio, e.g. Blom-Singer, Adeva, Eska, MediTop, and Heimomed. The internationally most widely used are devices made by InHealth Technologies and Atos Medical. In 1980, the first commercially available prosthesis was introduced by Singer and Blom: the 'Blom-Singer Duckbill', a 16 French diameter, non-flanged device that the patient could remove, clean and replace themself (non-indwelling). The first indwelling voice prosthesis (Groningen Voice Prostheis) was described in 1984. And in 1990, the first Provox voice prosthesis, manufactured by Atos Medical, was introduced to the market, followed by the Provox 2 in 1997, the Provox ActiValve in 2003, and the non-indwelling Provox NID in 2005. 1994, the Blom-Singer Classic Indwelling Voice Prostheses was introduced to the market. Like the Blom-Singer Advantage Indwelling Voice Prosthesis it is only inserted or replaced by medical professionals, such as speech pathologists or physicians. In 2009 the third generation Provox Vega with SmartInserter was introduced.

== Non-indwelling and indwelling voice prostheses ==
The two main categories voice prosthesis can be divided into are 'non-indwelling' and 'indwelling' voice prostheses. 'Non-indwelling' voice prostheses can be replaced by the patients themselves, whereas 'indwelling' prostheses have to be replaced by a medical professional. A non-indwelling voice prosthesis has a safety strap and may also have a string with a special safety medallion that is too wide to fall into the tracheostoma. It comes in different sizes and lengths and often has a noticeable color, e.g. blue or white to enhance visibility for self-replacement and maintenance. Disadvantages of the non-indwelling prosthesis are a certain amount of risk when inserting them by oneself and the devices have a shorter lifetime and need to be changed more often. In general it takes some practice to insert the prosthesis and the ability to take excellent care of the device. Indwelling devices have sturdier flanges and can only be replaced by a medical professional. The safety strap is cut off after insertion. The choice between 'non-indwelling' and 'indwelling' devices is really individual, depending on physical condition, maintenance and cost and can be alternated over a period of time to find out which one is most suitable.

== Design of voice prostheses ==
The general design of voice prosthesis is quite consistent, even though there are unique characteristics. A voice prosthesis has retaining flanges at each end, the 'tracheal flange' and 'esophageal flange'. Those flanges can vary in size and rigidity, e.g. indwelling prostheses have larger and more rigid flanges for stability and facilitate long-term placement. The flange near the food pipe (esophageal flange) is more rigid than the tracheal flange, near the windpipe. The one-way valve can be molded in one piece with the prosthesis and is often supported by a fluoroplastic valve seat (a colored ring that is tightly secured into the shaft of the prosthesis, adding rigidity and which is radiopaque). All voice prostheses have a safety strap, which is cut off in indwelling devices after the prosthesis is put in place; in non-indwelling devices the strap is not removed and is taped to the neck. A voice prosthesis has a one-way valve near the esophageal flange that enables pulmonary air to pass into the esophagus and pharynx for sound production and prevents content from the food pipe, such as liquids or saliva, from entering the trachea.

== Properties of voice prostheses ==
=== Material ===
A voice prosthesis is usually made of medical grade silicone rubber. The valve flap and valve seat may be made out of silicone, fluoroplastic, or may be treated with silver oxide.

=== Sizes ===
The size of a voice prosthesis varies in length, depending on the thickness of the wall between the foodpipe and the windpipe and thereby the length of the TE puncture. The according length of the voice prosthesis ranges usually between 4 and 22 mm. Another parameter is the outer diameter of the shaft of the voice prosthesis, ranging from 16 to 22.5 French. Which outer diameter is used is decided by the clinician and/or the patient and is most often a matter of personal preference. Studies have shown that a larger outer diameter of the voice prosthesis allows better airflow and thereby requires less effort to speak which has a positive effect on the overall voice quality.

== Solutions for short-lifespan prostheses ==
There are special voice prosthesis that solve particular problems, for example, for laryngectomized patients with very short device life times (less than 4 to 8 weeks) of their current prosthesis. Those extremely short device life times may be caused by excessive candida growth so that the valve of the prosthesis does not close properly due to biofilm formation. As a result, content from the food pipe leaks through the voice prosthesis into the windpipe. These specialized protheses generally implement one or more of the following:

- a magnet within the valve to strengthen the closure,
- silver oxide silicone or Teflon surface to reduce biofilm formation on the valve,
- the use two valves so that the other valve would seal in case of a defect on the esophageal valve.

In patients with a short device life, the use of a voice prosthesis with supporting magnets in the valve seat and valve flap has been proven to be cost effective.

== Cleaning ==
It is important to clean the voice prosthesis regularly, as the silicone material is exposed to yeast (candida) and bacteria in the food pipe, which is normally present in these areas. If yeast begins growing on or in the area of the valve flap of the voice prosthesis, it may not close well enough anymore. When this happens fluid starts to leak into the windpipe when eating or drinking.

=== Brushing ===
The inside of the voice prosthesis is usually cleaned with a brush, which removes food and mucus. It is recommended that the patient cleans the voice prosthesis regularly to keeps it open for speech and improve the device lifetime.

=== Flushing ===
It is also possible to flush the inside of the voice prosthesis with water or air. Usually this is done in combination with brushing.

== Leakage ==
A voice prosthesis has to be replaced regularly, because after a certain time, the valve flap of the voice prosthesis does not close properly anymore, due to yeast and other natural sediments. This causes leakage of saliva or drinks, which enters the wind pipe and makes the person concerned cough. If not resolved by cleaning the voice prosthesis, this is a sign that the voice prosthesis must be changed. If that is not possible right away, there are special plugs that can block the leakage. The patient can insert this plug themself before eating or drinking and remove it again afterwards, as speaking with the plug in place is usually not possible.

== Device lifetime ==
The device lifetime can range from a couple of weeks up to two years, depending on individual circumstances. The lifetime is influenced by daily food intake, especially dairy products, but also radiotherapy (Note: A Free University of Berlin study shows a different result) and GERD (Gastro Esophageal Reflux Disease) affects the voice prosthesis and its lifetime. The cause of the prothesis' life time end is mostly leakage, but also growing of fistulae, granulation tissue, increasing valve's opening pressure and prothesis' loss

== Voice quality and speaking effort ==
The voice quality when speaking with a voice prosthesis is influenced by pulmonary support, airflow resistance of the voice prosthesis, and airflow resistance of the new voice source. Although the voice prosthesis is only responsible for part of the total resistance – the neoglottis is responsible for the other part – favorable airflow characteristics are expected to enable the laryngectomized patient to speak with less effort. The voice sounds rather clear though not very loud as samples show.

== Voice prosthesis and HME ==
An individual combination of voice prosthesis, heat and moisture exchanger after laryngectomy and attachment is important for good speech and pulmonary rehabilitation. The HME sometimes is combined with free-hands-switch and virus and bacteria filter.
