= Electrolarynx =

Handheld device to produce clearer speech

Electrolaryngeal speech

И

Encoding
- Entity (decimal): &#1048;
- Unicode (hex): U+0418

An electrolarynx, sometimes referred to as a "throat back", is a medical device used to produce clearer speech by those people who have lost their voice box, usually due to cancer of the larynx. The most common device is a handheld, battery-operated device pressed against the skin under the mandible which produces vibrations to allow speech; other variations include a device similar to the "talk box" electronic music device, which delivers the basis of the speech sound via a tube placed in the mouth. Earlier non-electric devices were called mechanical larynxes. Along with developing esophageal voice, using a speech synthesizer, or undergoing a surgical procedure, the electrolarynx serves as a mode of speech recovery for laryngectomy patients.

The Voice Quality Symbol for electrolaryngeal phonation in speech is И, approximating the symbol for electricity.

== Overview ==
Initially, the pneumatic mechanical larynx was developed in the 1920s by Western Electric. It did not run on electricity, and was flawed in that it produced a strong voice. The device was displayed by Dr. Mackenty, at the Vanderbilt Clinic, Manhattan, in 1925. Air from the lung was ported into the mouth where the lips and tongue generated the sound. The concept is similar to the use of tubes with an electrolarynx.

However, more recent mechanical larynxes have demonstrated similar voice production to commercially available electrolarynxes. Electrolarynxes were introduced in the 1940s, at a time when esophageal speech was being promoted as the best course in speech recovery; however, since that technique is difficult to master, the electrolarynx became quite popular.

From 1938 Gilbert M Wright, an Inventor, filed and was granted a number of patents in the US of America for various applications of sound producing devices. Examples include a "Noiseless device for generating audible voice frequencies including harmonics" and another for use as a "Means and method of producing sound effects" for use in films.

Since then, medical procedures, such as the tracheo-oesophageal puncture, and the rarely performed laryngeal transplantation surgery, have been created to enable speech without continued dependence on a handheld device.

External media

Audio
- Using A New Voice To Enjoy Life After Cancer (2:54), StoryCorps

Video
- Communication after laryngectomy (8:58), South East Coast Laryngectomy Support Groups (UK)

The use of an electrolarynx can cause social issues, for instance difficulty ordering food, drinks, or other items in noisy environments; or, when answering a telephone, having the caller respond, "Am I talking to a computer?"

However, quality-of-life improvements due to electrolarynx usage are generally significant. One user states:

People are really very kind once they realize what the situation is. I may go into a restaurant once, and if I go back there a year later, and it's the same woman at the front desk, she'll say, "Where have you been? We haven't seen you for a while." So, I feel like a movie star...

I'm really very blessed in my life. I am happier now, without my voice, than I've ever been with my voice. It's a small price to pay for being alive and enjoying life. So I am very happy where I am now.

Traditional electrolarynxes produce a monotone buzz that the user articulates into speech sounds, resulting in the characteristic "robotlike" voice quality. However, in the 1990s, research and commercial multi-tone devices began to be developed, including discrete-tone devices using multiple-position switches or multiple buttons; as well as variable-tone devices controlled by single pressure-sensitive buttons, trackballs, gyroscopes, touchpad-like input devices, or even electrical detection of the movement of neck muscles. In addition to allowing speakers of non-tonal languages such as Malay to have a more natural speaking voice, some of these newer devices have allowed speakers of tonal languages such as Mandarin Chinese to speak more intelligibly.

== Notable fictional users ==
Fictional characters notable for their use of an electrolarynx include:

- Agents of "Leviathan" on Agent Carter
- Alfredo in The Hand of God
- Alpha 60 from Alphaville
- Anne Sawyer in Leatherface: The Texas Chainsaw Massacre III.
- Charlie in Mad Max
- Electrolarynx Guy (Jack Axelrod) on My Name Is Earl
- Emilio Sanchez, one of the residents of the Lawrence Hilton Jacobs housing project on The PJs
- Evil Troy from Community
- Glory Dodge in North Country
- Gray Baker in Dead Again
- Heathrow, Madea's brother in Tyler Perry's A Madea Family Funeral
- An Indigenous peoples of the Americas in Santa's Slay.
- The Killer from Night Terror
- Komtuan, the crime lord from the film Ong-Bak: Muay Thai Warrior, notable as a speaker of a tonal language being understood despite using a traditional monotone electrolarynx
- Nassara in Dry Season
- Ned Gerblanski from South Park
- Sani Crow in Banshee
- Sawyer the Cleaner from Black Lagoon
- Sheriff Jerry/Angela Baker in Return to Sleepaway Camp
- Smokie Martling, a parody of Jackie Martling from The Howard Stern Show
- The Smoking Family from Chewin' The Fat
- Stemroach (David Bradley) on Ideal
- A victim survivor in Cell.
- WWE wrestler Kane, for his first three years in the company (1997–1999)
- Walter Wingfield in Say It Isn't So
- Zimos from Saints Row The Third
- A member of Black Dragons in Casse-tête chinois pour le judoka
- Lt. Claymore in Zebra Force (1976)
- Colonel Vox in Justice League (episode "Maid of Honor")

== See also ==
- Esophageal speech
- Larynx § Treatments
- Silent speech interface
