= Faucalized voice =

Vocal quality

Faucalized

◌͈

◌ꟸ

Encoding
- Entity (decimal): &#43000;
- Unicode (hex): U+A7F8

Faucalized voice, also called hollow voice or yawny voice, is a vocal quality of speech production characterized by the vertical expansion of the pharyngeal cavity due to the lowering of the larynx. It is termed faucalized because of the stretching of the fauces and visible narrowing of the faucial pillars in the back of the oral cavity. During faucalized voice, the sides of pharynx expand outward and the larynx descends and tilts forward. The term "yawny voice" is appropriate to compare this voice quality to the physiological act of yawning. Its opposite is harsh voice, a vocal quality produced when the pharynx is contracted and the larynx raised. Faucalized voice is not to be confused with breathy voice, which involves relaxed vocal folds, greater velocity of airflow through the glottis and produces a lower pitch sound. Faucalized voice involves the forward tilting of the larynx which stretches the vocal folds and produces a higher pitch sound, despite the increased volume of the pharyngeal cavity.

There is no symbol for faucalized voice in the standard IPA. Diacritics seen in the literature include the linguolabial diacritic ([a̼]) or the strong articulation diacritic ([a͈]) of the Extensions to the IPA. In the VoQS, the voice-quality symbol for faucalized voice is {Vꟸ}. The asterisk, IPA for articulations that do not have existing symbols, could also be used: ⟨◌͙⟩.

== Nilotic languages ==
It is widely accepted that the Bor dialect of the Dinka language (also called Moinyjieng) has two distinct voice qualities: modal voice and breathy voice. The existence of two additional voice qualities, faucalized (or hollow) voice and harsh (or tense) voice, is claimed by linguist Keith Denning among others.

phonation	IPA	translation
modal	tɕìt̪	diarrhea
breathy	tɕì̤t̪	go ahead
harsh	tɕɛt̪	scorpions
faucalized	tɕɛ͈t̪	to swallow

Faucalized voice and harsh voice denote a contrast between the verbal categories venitive (movement toward the speaker) and itive (movement away from the speaker). Voice quality is also contrastive between singular and plural nouns in Dinka and other Nilotic languages (Nuer and Shilluk), but this relationship is less regular. In the following tables, modal ("hard") vowels contrast with faucalized ("breathy"). Notice that faucalization corresponds with the ventive case and with plural nouns.

Dinka	translation
ɣɛ́n cɔ̀ˑl më̀t̪	I call the boy
ɣɛ́n cò͈ò͈l më̀t̪	I call the boy here (direction towards)
ɣɛ́n cɔ́ɔ́l më̀t̪	I call the boy away (direction away)

Dinka	translation	Nuer	translation	Shilluk	translation
lé͈ˑì͈	tooth	rí͈ŋ	meat	bàt	arm
lêc	teeth	ríŋ	meats	bä͈́ä͈̀t	arms
