= Quzhou dialect =

Wu Chinese dialect of Quzhou, China

- 衢州話
- Pronunciation: [dʒy tɕiɯ ɦuɑ]
- Native to: People's Republic of China
- Region: Quzhou prefecture, Zhejiang
- Language family: Sino-Tibetan: Sinitic; Wu; Chuqu; Quzhou dialect

Language codes
- ISO 639-3: –
- Glottolog: chuz1238

The Quzhou dialect (衢州話; pronounced Wu Chinese pronunciation: [d̥͡ʒ̊y.tɕiɯ.ɦuɑ] in the Quzhou dialect) is a dialect of Wu Chinese spoken in Quzhou, China.

== Phonology ==
=== Initials ===
		Labial	Dental	Palatal	Postalveolar	Velar	Glottal
Nasal		m 迷	n 拿	ɲ 寧		ŋ 咬	
Plosive	tenuis	p 巴	t 丁			k 公	ʔ 愛
Plosive	aspirated	pʰ 怕	tʰ 聽			kʰ 空	
Plosive	slack voice	b̥ 爬	d̥ 停			ɡ̊ 共	
Affricate	tenuis		ts 增	tɕ 九	tʃ 真		
Affricate	aspirated		tsʰ 寸	tɕʰ 秋	tʃʰ 春		
Affricate	slack voice		d̥z̥ 存	d̥ʑ̊ 求	d̥ʒ̊ 陳		
Fricative	tenuis	f 方	s 森	ɕ 心	ʃ 雙	x 好	
Fricative	slack voice	v̥ 房	z̥ 時	ʑ̊ 尋	ʒ̊ 床	ɣ̊ 或	
Approximant			l 來	(j) 移		(w) 吳	ɦ 或

=== Finals ===
Medial	Nucleus															
Medial	∅	ɑ	e̞	ɘɪ	ɔ	ɤ	ə	æ	ən	ã	ɒ̃	oŋ	əʔ	ənʔ	ɐ̞ʔ	liquid
∅	試 [ʐ]	家 [ɑ]	菜 [e̞]	走 [ɘɪ]	包 [ɔ]	勾 [ɤ]	南 [ə]	三 [æ]	本 [ən]	打 [ã]	方 [ɒ̃]	公 [oŋ]	六 [əʔ]	脱 [ənʔ]	白 [ɐ̞ʔ]	爾 [ɫ]
i	去 [i]	謝 [iɑ]	變 [ie]		表 [iɔ]	九 [iɯ]			金 [iɲ]	兩 [iã]	旺 [iɒ̃]	窘 [ioŋ]	业 [iɘʔ]		弱 [iɐ̞ʔ]	姆 [m]
u	布 [u]	瓜 [uɑ]	快 [ue̞]	會 [uɘɪ]			官 [uə]	慣 [uæ]	昏 [uən]	昌 [uã]	光 [uɒ̃]		國 [uəʔ]		划 [uɐ̞ʔ]	魚 [ŋ]
y	雨 [y]						捐 [yə]		運 [yɲ]				肉 [yəʔ]			水衢 [ɥ]

=== Tones ===
The Quzhou dialect is considered to have seven tones. However, since the tone split from Middle Chinese, characters still depend on the voicing of the initial consonant. These constitute just three phonemic tones: ping, shang, and qu. (Ru syllables are phonemically toneless.)

Tone chart of Quzhou dialect
Number	Tone name	Tone contour	Examples
1	陰平 yīn píng	[˦] (44)	江天飛空
2	陽平 yáng píng	[˩˩˨] (112)	來同魚頭
3	陰上 yīn shàng	[˧˦] (34)	懂紙古口
4	陽上去 yáng shàngqù	[˧˩] (31)	外地路道
5	陰去 yīn qù	[˥˨] (52)	對去馬你
6	陰入 yīn rù	[˥ʔ] (5)	各黑出脫
7	陽入 yáng rù	[˩˨ʔ] (12)	六肉白石

== Grammar ==
=== Sentence structure ===
你 我 個 朋友 啘。
ni ŋu kəʔ põ.jɤ ue
2SG 1SG GEN friend PTCL
You are my friend

The first example can be compared with Japanese: あなたは私の友達だよ。(anata wa watashi no tomodachi dayo.) Here, 啘 resembles Japanese だよ (dayo).

渠(其) 你 老師 啘， 要 尊重 人家。
ɡ̊i ɲi lɔ.sʐ ue, iɔ t͡seɲ.d̥͡ʒ̊õ niŋ.kɒ
3SG 2SG teacher PTCL, have respect other
He/she is your teacher, and you have to respect him/her.

鉛筆 借 支 我 好伐？
kæ.piəʔ t͡ʃiɒ t͡sʐ ŋu xɔ.fɐ̞ʔ
pencil borrow CL 1SG INTERR
Can I borrow a pencil?

飯 再 喫 碗 添， 多 吃 些兒 啊。
v̥æ t͡se t͡ɕʰiəʔ uə tʰie, tu t͡ɕʰiəʔ ʃin o
rice/meal again eat bowl PTCL? more eat more+ PTCL
If you want to eat more, then eat more if you'd like.

感冒藥 喫嘞 朆 你， 覅 記弗着 掉 唻！
kə.mɔ.jɐ̞ʔ t͡ɕʰiəʔ.ləʔ v̥ən ɲi, fiɔ t͡ɕʰi.fəʔ.t͡ʃɐ̞ʔ tɔ le
{cold medicine} taking/eating INTERR 2SG, NEG verb-remember/NEG PTCL IMP
Have you taken your cold medicine yet? Don't forget to take it!

== Lexicon ==
=== Pronouns ===
- 我 [ŋu˥˨] 1st person singular
- 你 [ɲi˥˨] 2nd person singular
- 渠[ ɡ̊i˩˩˨] 3rd person singular
- 我達 [ŋu˥˨.d̥ɐ̞ʔ˩˨], 我拉 [ŋu˥˨.lɐ̞ʔ˩˨] (我耷) 1st person plural
- 你達 [ɲi˥˨.d̥ɐ̞ʔ˩˨, 你拉 [ɲi˥˨.lɐ̞ʔ˩˨], 爾耷- [n][tAʔ]/[d̥Aʔ], [lAʔ] 2nd person plural
- 渠達 [ɡ̊i˩˩˨.d̥ɐ̞ʔ˩˨], 渠拉 [ɡ̊i˩˩˨lɐ̞ʔ˩˨] (渠耷) 3rd person plural
