= Harsh voice =

Manner of production of speech sounds

Harsh

◌᷽

◌᷂

(◌ꜝ)

(◌ꜝꜝ)

Harsh voice, also called ventricular voice or (in some high-tone registers) pressed voice, is the production of speech sounds (typically vowels) with a constricted laryngeal cavity, which generally involves epiglottal co-articulation. Harsh voice includes the use of the ventricular folds (the false vocal cords) to damp the glottis in a way similar to what happens when a person talks while lifting a heavy load, or, if the sound is voiceless, like clearing one's throat. It contrasts with faucalized voice, which involves the expansion of the larynx.

When the epiglottal co-articulation becomes a trill, the vowels are called strident.

There is no symbol for harsh voice in the IPA. Diacritics seen in the literature include the under-tilde used for creaky voice, which may be appropriate when ambiguity is not a problem, the double under-tilde used as the ad hoc diacritic for strident vowels, which may be allophonic with harsh voice, and an ad hoc underline. In the VoQS, possibly relevant voice-quality symbols are {V!} ("harsh voice"), {V!!} ("ventricular phonation"), and {V͈} ("pressed phonation/tight voice"), but these are normally only placed on a capital ⟨V⟩ for "voice". In VoQS usage, "harsh voice" does not involve vibration of the ventricular folds, while in "pressed" or "tight" voice the arytenoid cartilages adduct so that only the anterior ligamental vocal folds vibrate. The asterisk, IPA for articulations that do not have existing symbols, could also be used: ⟨◌͙⟩.

The Bai language has both harsh ("pressed") and strident vowels as part of its register system, but they are not contrastive.

The Bor dialect of Dinka has contrastive modal, breathy, faucalized, and harsh voice in its vowels, as well as three tones. (The ad hoc diacritics employed in the source are a subscript double quotation mark for faucalized voice, [a͈], and underlining for harsh voice, [a̠], a diacritic that indicates retraction in the IPA.) Examples are:

Phonation	IPA	Gloss
modal	tɕìt	'diarrhea'
breathy	tɕì̤t	'go ahead'
harsh	tɕì᷽t	'scorpions'
faucalized	tɕì͈t	'to swallow'

== See also ==
- Overtone singing
