= Tracheo-esophageal puncture =

- Specialty: Laryngology
- ICD-9-CM: 31.95

A tracheo-esophageal puncture (or tracheoesophageal puncture) is a surgically created hole between the trachea (windpipe) and the esophagus (food pipe) in a person who has had a total laryngectomy, a surgery where the larynx (voice box) is removed. The purpose of the puncture is to restore a person’s ability to speak after the vocal cords have been removed. This involves creation of a fistula between the trachea and the esophagus, puncturing the short segment of tissue or “common wall” that typically separates these two structures. A voice prosthesis is inserted into this puncture. The prosthesis keeps food out of the trachea but lets air into the esophagus for esophageal speech.

A laryngectomized person is required to breathe through a permanent breathing hole in the neck, called a tracheostoma. When a laryngectomized person occludes the tracheostoma, completely blocking exhaled air to leave the body through that pathway, exhaled air is directed through the voice prosthesis. This air enters the esophagus and escapes through the mouth. During this process, as the air passes through the upper tissues of the esophagus and lower throat, it allows for vibration of the tissues of the pharyngo-esophageal segment (also called PE-segment, neoglottis or pseudoglottis). This vibration creates a sound that serves to replace the sound the vocal cords previously produced. Other methods of alaryngeal speech (speech without vocal cords) are esophageal speech, and electrolaryngeal speech. Studies show that tracheo-esophageal speech is found to be closer to normal speech than esophageal speech and is often reported to be better, both in terms of naturalness as well as how well it is understood, when compared to esophageal speech and electrolarynx speech. The first report on a tracheo-esophageal puncture dates back to 1932 when a laryngectomized patient was said to use a hot ice pick to create a tracheo-esophageal puncture in himself. This enabled him to speak by forcing air through the puncture when closing off the tracheostoma with a finger.

== Puncture procedures ==
There are two tracheo-esophageal puncture procedure types: Primary and secondary puncture. Initially, the procedure was described as a secondary procedure and later also as a primary procedure.

=== Primary tracheo-esophageal puncture ===
This procedure is performed during the total laryngectomy surgery. After removal of the larynx and creation of the tracheostoma, the puncture is made through the back wall of the trachea into the front wall of the esophagus. The main advantages of a primary puncture are: 1) that a second surgery to create the puncture is avoided (including the related costs and risks) and: 2) that the patient will be able to speak within a few weeks after total laryngectomy.

There are cases where a primary procedure cannot be performed. For example, this procedure cannot be used when there is complete separation of the tracheo-esophageal wall where the puncture would otherwise be placed (for example, in case a portion of the esophagus is removed requiring an anastomosis, or “reconnection” of structures in the region). In that case, a sufficient period of recovery and wound healing would be required. A secondary puncture could then be placed.

=== Secondary tracheo-esophageal puncture ===
This procedure refers to a puncture that is placed anytime after the total laryngectomy surgery. The decision to use a primary or secondary puncture can vary greatly. Secondary puncture can be performed when: 1) primary puncture was not possible, 2) for re-puncture after closure of a previous tracheo-esophageal puncture, 3) because of physician or patient preference, and 4) in case failure of esophageal or electrolarynx speech if this was chosen as the initial speech option.

== Placement of the voice prosthesis ==
There are two different methods that can be used to place the voice prosthesis: Primary placement: A voice prosthesis is placed into the puncture immediately after it is created. During the immediate postoperative period, the patient is fed through a feeding tube, either inserted directly into the stomach or through a more temporary version than extends from the nose into the stomach. This tube is removed when the patient is able to eat enough by mouth to maintain nutritional needs; this can be as early as the second day following surgery. Speech production with the voice prosthesis is initiated when the surgical area has healed, after clearance by the surgeon. The advantages of this method are: 1) the voice prosthesis stabilizes the TE wall, 2) the flanges of the device protect the puncture against leakage of fluids, stomach acids and other stomach contents, 3) there is no irritation or pressure from a stenting catheter, used to maintain the puncture opening until a voice prosthesis can be placed, 4) patients become quickly familiar with their prosthesis care as they receive instructions while hospitalized, 5) the patient will not have to undergo an outpatient procedure during which the voice prosthesis needs to be fitted, 6) many patients can learn to speak before the start of any post-operative radiation therapy (if indicated) 7) the patient can focus on voice production immediately, as wound healing allows.

Another advantage is that generally, the voice prosthesis placed at the time of surgery lasts relatively long and requires no early frequent replacements. The only disadvantage is that the patient will need to use a feeding tube for a few days.

Delayed placement: Instead of the voice prosthesis, a catheter (red rubber, Silastic Foley catheter, Ryle's tube) is introduced through the puncture into esophagus. The tube is sometimes utilized for feeding the patient during the immediate post operative period, or the patient has a standard feeding tube for feeding. The voice prosthesis is placed after the patient is able to eat sufficiently by mouth and speech production is initiated when healing has completed, after clearance by the surgeon. The advantage of this method is that the patient may be fed through the catheter, not requiring standard tube feeding. The primary disadvantage is that the patient will have to undergo an outpatient procedure to have the voice prosthesis placed. Another disadvantage can be the need for more frequent replacements early after fitting of the voice prosthesis due to changes in the length of the puncture.

== Indications ==
Indications include voice rehabilitation for patients who are undergoing a total laryngectomy (primary puncture) or patients who have had a total laryngectomy in the past (secondary puncture). Contra-indications are mainly related to the use of the voice prosthesis and not the puncture procedure itself. It is important to have healthy tissue at the puncture site. This will help ensure the voice prosthesis is properly supported. Poor tissue condition at the puncture site can be a contra-indication for TE puncture. It is also important that the patient candidacy be taken into account. Patients must be able to understand and manage proper prosthesis maintenance and monitor for complications or device problems. Bleeding disorders, anxiety disorders, dementia, poor vision and poor manual dexterity are all factors that may negatively interfere with successful voice restoration using tracheo-esophageal techniques and should be discussed further with an appropriate healthcare provider who is knowledgeable in this topic.
