= Alaryngeal speech =

Speech made without the larynx/voice box

Alaryngeal speech is speech using an airstream mechanism that uses features other than the glottis to create voicing. There are three types: esophageal, buccal, and pharyngeal speech. Each of these uses an alternative method of creating phonation to substitute for the vocal cords in the larynx. These forms of alaryngeal speech are also called "pseudo-voices".

== Esophageal speech ==
Esophageal speech

Œ

Encoding
- Entity (decimal): &#338;
- Unicode (hex): U+0152

Esophageal speech uses air supply to create phonation from the esophagus and pharyngo-esophageal segment to act as a replacement for the glottis. It is usually acquired following speech therapy after laryngectomy as a replacement for laryngeal speech.

== Buccal speech ==
Buccal speech

ↀ

Encoding
- Entity (decimal): &#8576;
- Unicode (hex): U+2180

This is created by producing an air bubble between the left (or right) upper jaw and the cheek that can act as an alternative "lung". The person then uses muscular action to drive the air through a small gap between or behind the teeth into the mouth. The sound so produced makes a high rough sound. This then is articulated to make speech. It is usually acquired as a taught or self-learnt skill for entertainment. It can be used as a method of singing. It is also known as Donald Duck talk due to its alleged use by Clarence Charles "Ducky" Nash for the voice of the Disney Donald Duck character (though Nash claims that buccal speech is not used for this character).

- sung buccal voice can have a range of three octaves (69 Hz to 571 Hz)
- maximum duration of phonation for a series of sustained vowels is 2 seconds.
- from most intelligible to least: glides, fricatives, plosives, affricates, and nasals.
- on rhyme-test 76% of buccal spoken words were intelligible.
- buccal speech is more than two octaves above that of esophageal speakers (this gives it a raised pitch compared to normal speech).

The VoQS indication for buccal speech is {ↀ}. For example, a buccal raspberry (interdental trill) can be written [ↀ͡r̪͆].

== Pharyngeal speech ==
This is created by producing the air supply needed for phonation in the pharynx and creating a replacement for the glottis using the tongue and the upper alveolus, the palate, or the pharyngeal wall.

In one case, pharyngeal speech was studied in a 12-year-old girl that used it as her exclusive form of speech following tracheotomy at 2 years of age. Such speech was impaired in spite of ten years of her exclusive use of it for communication. Fifty percent of her time while speaking was silence. Of the other fifty percent, half was spent creating “quasiperiodic” speech-like sound and the other half spent creating noise. This produced an “unpleasant, markedly hoarse voice quality which was consistently evident in her pharyngeal speech". This contrasts with skilled esophageal speakers that spend less than 20% of their time producing noise. Such speech has limited success in making sounds in some places of articulation, and especially sounds in some manners of articulation, and voicing phonetic distinctions. There are also difficulties in creating consonant clusters and polysyllabic words. Such speech was "generally well understood by immediate family members" but "reported to be largely unintelligible to outsiders".

== Importance ==
Pharyngeal speech can be produced in the early stages of learning esophageal speech. However both buccal and pharyngeal speech are less clear than trained esophageal speech and "should not be regarded as a desirable or practical primary method of alaryngeal speech".

== See also ==
- Electrolarynx
- Airstream mechanism
- Phonation
- Vocal extended technique
- Whistled language
