= Diplophonia =

Medical phenomenon

V̬‼

Diplophonia, also known as diphthongia, is a phenomenon in which a voice is perceived as being produced with two concurrent pitches (not to be confused with overtone singing, in which singers actually, and deliberately, produce two tones at the same time). Diplophonia is a result of vocal fold vibrations that are quasi-periodic in nature. It has been reported from old days, but there is no uniform interpretation of established mechanisms. It has been established that diplophonia can be caused by various vocal fold pathologies, such as vocal folds polyp, vocal fold nodule, recurrent laryngeal nerve paralysis or vestibular fold hypertrophy.

The Voice Quality Symbol for diplophonia is V̬‼.
