= Chu–Qu Wu =

Southern Wu Chinese language

- 吳語處衢片
- Native to: People's Republic of China
- Region: Zhejiang
- Native speakers: (6.5 million cited 1987)
- Language family: Sino-Tibetan: Sinitic; Wu; Chu–Qu Wu

Language codes
- ISO 639-3: None (mis)
- ISO 639-6: cuqu
- Glottolog: chuq1241
- Linguasphere: 79-AAA-di

Chu–Qu Wu (simplified Chinese: 处衢片; traditional Chinese: 處衢片; pinyin: Chùqúpiàn) is a Southern Wu Chinese language spoken in Southern Zhejiang in Quzhou and Lishui prefectures, as well as some parts of Southern Wenzhou prefecture. It is also spoken in Shangrao and Yushan counties in Jiangxi province, and the northern part of Ningde and Nanping prefectures in Fujian province bordering Zhejiang. It is not mutually intelligible with Taihu Wu.

== List of Chu–Qu Wu dialects ==
- Quzhou dialect
- Jiangshan dialect
- Qingtian dialect
- Lishui dialect
