= Stiff voice =

Method of pronunciation

Voiced

◌̬

Encoding
- Entity (decimal): &#812;
- Unicode (hex): U+032C
Image

The term stiff voice describes the pronunciation of consonants or vowels with a glottal opening narrower, and the vocal folds stiffer, than occurs in modal voice. Although there is no specific IPA diacritic for stiff voice, the voicing diacritic (a subscript wedge) may be used in conjunction with the symbol for a voiced consonant. (Note: SOWL page 64.) In Bru, for example, stiff-voiced vowels have tenseness in the glottis and pharynx without going so far as to be creaky voiced, whereas slack-voiced vowels are lax in the glottis without going so far as to be breathy voice.

One language with stiff voice is Thai:

	Bilabial			Dental		
phonation	Thai	IPA	gloss	Thai	IPA	gloss
stiff voice	บ้า bâa	[b̬âː]	'crazy'	ด่า dàa	[d̪̬àː]	'curse, scold'
tenuis	ป้า bpâa	[pâː]	'aunt'	ตา dtaa	[t̪āː]	'eye'
aspirated	ผ้า pâa	[pʰâː]	'cloth'	ท่า tâa	[t̪ʰâː]	'landing place'

Javanese contrasts stiff and slack voiced bilabial, dental, retroflex, and velar stops.

	Bilabial		Dental Stop		Dental Affricate		Retroflex		Velar	
phonation	IPA	gloss	IPA	gloss	IPA	gloss	IPA	gloss	IPA	gloss
stiff voice	[paku]	'nail'	[tamu]	'guest'	[tsariʔ]	'sheet (of paper)'	[ʈiʈiʔ]	'little'	[kali]	'river'
slack voice	[b̥aku]	'standard'	[d̥amu]	'blow'	[d̥z̥arit]	(type of women's clothing)	[ɖ̥isiʔ]	'first'	[ɡ̊ali]	'dig'

Mpi (Loloish) contrasts modals and stiff voice in its vowels. This is not register: for each of the six Mpi tones, a word may have either a modal or stiff-voiced vowel. For example, low tone contrasts /sì/ 'blood' and /sì̬/ 'seven'.
