= Case in tiers =

Case in tiers is a model for assigning surface case to noun phrases (NPs) in a sentence. Introduced in Yip, Maling, and Jackendoff 1987, it has received at least 88 scholarly citations according to Google Scholar. The model takes its inspiration from the seminal and at that time already successful model of prosodic morphology (McCarthy 1981), which posits that the structure of a phonological word is a stack of types of elements (e.g., vowels, consonants, syllabic pitches), with each element type being provided with its own tier of the stack. Yip et al. decompose the structure of an individual sentence into a tier of structural cases, a tier of lexical cases, and a skeletal tier of the NPs in the sentence. The structural case tier is homologous to the consonant matrix lexical root of a Semitic verb, while the lexical case tier is homologous to the set of vowels in a Semitic verb word form. The lexical cases are assigned to specific NPs in the skeletal tier. The structural cases are assigned sequentially, with the direction of assignment depending on which case alignment is the characteristic one for the language in question. For nominative–accusative alignment, the structural cases are assigned from left to right, with nominative case preceding accusative. For ergative–absolutive alignment, the direction of assignment is right to left, with absolutive preceding ergative. For instance:

- Nominative alignment (English):
  - intransitive verb: He NOM ran.
  - transitive verb: He NOM sees me ACC.
- Ergative alignment (West Greenlandic) (Yip et al. 1987: 220):
  - intransitive verb: Kaali ABS pisuppoq. = 'Karl is walking.'
  - transitive verb: Kaalip ERG Hansi ABS takuaa. = 'Karl sees Hans.' (Sadock ex. 12a)

In debuting the model, the authors claimed for it the following achievements: unification of ergative and nominative case alignments under a single framework; accounting for the movement of lexical case with an NP in passivization; and accounting for the appearance of post-verbal nominative case in Icelandic. However, the model seemed to fail when assigning case in languages with OSV word order or free word order. It also did not correctly handle some grammatical voices, e.g., the antipassive voice.
