= Diaeresis =

Diaeresis (dieresis, diæresis, diëresis) may refer to:

- Diaeresis (prosody), pronunciation of vowels in a diphthong separately, or the division made in a line of poetry when the end of a foot coincides with the end of a word
- Diaeresis (linguistics), or hiatus, the separation of adjacent vowels into syllables, not separated by a consonant or pause and not merged into a diphthong
- Diaeresis (diacritic), a diacritic consisting of two side-by-side dots that marks disyllabicity
- Diaeresis (computing), the name used by the Unicode Consortium for the "two-dots above" diacritic

== See also ==
- Two dots (diacritic), the "two side-by-side dots" diacritic, often called a "Diaeresis", despite its having further linguistic uses, such as umlaut and schwa.
- Diairesis, a term in Platonic and Stoic philosophy, the division of a genus into its parts
