= Outline of principles of interpretation =

Overview of and topical guide to principles of interpretation

The following outline is provided as an overview of and topical guide to the principles of interpretation:

Principles of interpretation – methods used to understand language and texts, primarily legal documents and sacred texts. Principles of interpretation may be used in the areas presented below...

== Christianity ==
- Biblical hermeneutics, the study of the principles of interpretation concerning the books of the Bible
- Biblical studies - Principles of Biblical interpretation
- Daniel 2 - Interpretation given by Daniel
- Daniel 7 - Interpretation given by Gabriel
- Daniel 8 - Interpretation given by Gabriel
- Johann Albrecht Bengel
- Cornelius Van Til
- List of Church Fathers - Tichonius

== Judaism ==
- Moshe Shmuel Glasner
- Talmudical hermeneutics

== Islam ==
- Qur'an - Interpretation and meanings
- Qur'anic hermeneutics

== Law and government ==
- Canadian constitutional law
- Traditional Chinese law
- Francis Lieber
- Allonby v Accrington and Rossendale College
- Attorney General of Belize v Belize Telecom Ltd
- Interpretation (Catholic canon law)

== Other uses ==
- Heritage interpretation - "Tilden's principles" of interpretation
- Interpretive planning, an initial step in the planning and design process for informal learning-based institutions

== See also ==
- Exegesis
- Hermeneutics
