= Thematic role =

Thematic role is a linguistic notion, which may refer to:

- Theta role (in syntax or at the syntax-semantics interface), the formal device for representing syntactic argument structure—the number and type of noun phrases—required syntactically by a particular verb
- Thematic relation (in semantics), a term to express the role that a noun phrase plays with respect to the action or state described by a governing verb

However, it should not be confused with the use of thematic with reference to the stem ("the theme") of an inflected word, as in thematic vowel.
