= Laryngectomy =

Surgical removal of all or part of the larynx

- Anatomical changes following a laryngectomy
- ICD-9-CM: 30.2 30.3 30.4
- MeSH: D007825
- MedlinePlus: 007398

Laryngectomy is the removal of the larynx. In a total laryngectomy, the entire larynx is removed (including the vocal folds, hyoid bone, epiglottis, thyroid and cricoid cartilage and a few tracheal cartilage rings) with the separation of the airway from the mouth, nose and esophagus. In a partial laryngectomy, only a portion of the larynx is removed. Following the procedure, the person breathes through an opening in the neck known as a stoma. This procedure is usually performed by an ENT surgeon in cases of laryngeal cancer. Many cases of laryngeal cancer are treated with more conservative methods (surgeries through the mouth, radiation and/or chemotherapy). A laryngectomy is performed when these treatments fail to conserve the larynx or when the cancer has progressed such that normal functioning would be prevented. Laryngectomies are also performed on individuals with other types of head and neck cancer. Less invasive partial laryngectomies, including tracheal shaves and feminization laryngoplasty may also be performed on transgender women and/or non-binary transfeminine individuals to feminize the larynx and/or voice. Post-laryngectomy rehabilitation includes voice restoration, oral feeding and more recently, smell and taste rehabilitation. An individual's quality of life can be affected post-surgery. People who are laryngectomized are vocal amputees.

== History ==
The first total laryngectomy was performed in 1873 by Theodor Billroth. The patient was a thirty-six-year-old man with a subglottic squamous cell carcinoma. On November 27, 1873, Billroth performed a partial laryngectomy. Subsequent laryngoscopic examination in mid-December 1873 found tumor recurrence. On December 31, 1873, Billroth performed the first total laryngectomy. The patient was discharged four months later after he learned to use the artificial larynx, which enabled him to speak despite the removal of his vocal cords. Unfortunately, the patient developed a recurrence of the lesion, accompanied by metastatic nodes, and passed away a year following the surgery.

Older references credit a Patrick Watson of Edinburgh with the first laryngectomy in 1866, but this patient's larynx was only excised after death.

The first artificial larynx was constructed by Johann Nepomuk Czermak in 1869. Vincenz Czerny developed an artificial larynx which he tested in dogs in 1870.

Following the pioneering efforts of Billroth, the practice of total laryngectomy gained momentum among surgeons. The early attempts at this procedure, including the second ever performed by Bernhard Heine in 1874 and subsequent operations by Hermann Maas and others, often resulted in the patient's death due to complications or recurrence of disease within months. It wasn't until Enrico Bottini in Italy achieved the first long-term survival of a laryngectomy patient that the potential for lasting success was realized. The period also saw notable failures and challenges, including the tragic case of Crown Prince Frederick of Germany (the future Frederick III). Misdiagnosed initially in 1887 by Morell Mackenzie as benign, Frederick's condition was later identified as cancerous, leading to his death after a tracheostomy. This case highlighted the controversies and difficulties in diagnosing and treating laryngeal cancer, which persisted into the early 20th century.

Advancements in direct laryngoscopy and suspension laryngoscopy, credited to Killian and Lynch respectively, improved the evaluation and surgical management of the larynx. Despite significant challenges such as wound infection, anesthesia, and shock, pioneers like George Washington Crile—which performed the first laryngectomy in U.S. in 1892—made significant contributions to reducing operative mortality and advancing techniques in neck surgery and the management of metastatic disease.

== Incidence and prevalence ==
According to the GLOBOCAN, 2,018 estimates of cancer incidence and mortality produced by the International Agency for Research on Cancer, there were 177,422 new cases of laryngeal cancer worldwide in 2018 (1.0% of the global total.) Among worldwide cancer deaths, 94,771 (1.0%) were due to laryngeal cancer.

In 2019, it is estimated that there will be 12,410 new laryngeal cancer cases in the United States, (3.0 per 100,000). The number of new cases decreases every year at a rate of 2.4%, and this is believed to be related to decreased cigarette smoking in the general population. The number of laryngectomies performed each year in the U.S. has been declining at an even faster rate due to the development of less invasive techniques. A study using the National Inpatient Sample found that there were 8,288 total laryngectomy cases performed in the US between 1998 and 2008, and that hospitals performing total laryngectomy decreased by 12.3 per year. As of 2013, one reference estimates that there are 50,000 to 60,000 laryngectomees in the US.

== Identification ==
To determine the severity/spread of the laryngeal cancer and the level of vocal fold function, indirect laryngoscopies using mirrors, endoscopies (rigid or flexible) and/or stroboscopies may be performed. Other methods of visualization using CT scans, MRIs and PET scans and investigations of the cancer through biopsy can also be completed. Acoustic observations can also be utilized, where certain laryngeal cancer locations (e.g. at the level of the glottis) can cause an individual's voice to sound hoarse.

Examinations are used to determine the tumor classification (TNM classification) and the stage (1–4) of the tumor. The increasing classifications from T1 to T4 indicates the spread/size of the tumor and provides information on which surgical intervention is recommended, where T1-T3 (smaller tumors) may require partial laryngectomies and T4 (larger tumors) may require complete laryngectomies. Radiation and/or chemotherapy may also be used.

== The airways and ventilation after laryngectomy ==
Anatomy of the larynx

The anatomy and physiology of the airways change after laryngectomy. After a total laryngectomy, the individual breathes through a stoma where the tracheostomy has created an opening in the neck. There is no longer a connection between the trachea and the mouth and nose. After a partial laryngectomy, the individual breathes mainly through the stoma, but a connection still exists between the trachea and upper airways such that these individuals are able to breathe air through the mouth and nose. The extent of breathing through the upper airways in these individuals varies and a tracheostomy tube is present in many of them. Ventilation and resuscitation of total and partial neck breathers is performed through the stoma. However, for these individuals, the mouth should be kept closed and the nose should be sealed to prevent air escape during resuscitation.

== Complications ==
Different types of complications can follow total laryngectomy. The most frequent postoperative complication is pharyngocutaneous fistula (PCF), characterized by an abnormal opening between the pharynx and the trachea or the skin resulting in the leaking of saliva outside of the throat. This complication, which requires feeding to be completed via nasogastric tube, increases morbidity, length of hospitalization, and level of discomfort, and may delay rehabilitation. Up to 29% of persons who undergo total laryngectomy will be affected by PCF. Various factors have been associated with an increased risk of experiencing this type of complication. These factors include anaemia, hypoalbuminaemia, poor nutrition, hepatic and renal dysfunction, preoperative tracheostomy, smoking, alcohol use, older age, chronic obstructive pulmonary disease and localization and stage of cancer. However, the installation of a free-flap has been shown to significantly reduce the risks of PCF. Other complications such as wound infection, dehiscence and necrosis, bleeding, pharyngeal and stomal stenosis, and dysphagia have also been reported in fewer cases.

== Rehabilitation ==
=== Voice restoration ===
Total laryngectomy results in the removal of the larynx, an organ essential for natural sound production. The loss of voice and of normal and efficient verbal communication is a negative consequence associated with this type of surgery and can have significant impacts on the quality of life of these individuals. Voice rehabilitation is an important component of the recovery process following the surgery. Technological and scientific advances over the years have led to the development of different techniques and devices specialized in voice restoration.

The desired method of voice restoration should be selected based on each individual's abilities, needs, and lifestyle. Factors that affect success and candidacy for any chosen voice restoration method could include: cognitive ability, individual physiology, motivation, physical ability, and pre-existing medical conditions.

Pre and post-operative sessions with a speech-language pathologist (SLP) are often part of the treatment plan for people undergoing a total laryngectomy. Pre-operative sessions would likely involve counselling on the function of the larynx, the options for post-op voice restoration, and managing expectations for outcomes and rehabilitation. Post-operative therapy sessions with an SLP would aim to help individuals learn to vocalize and care for their new voice prosthesis as well as refine their use of speech depending on the chosen method of voice restoration.

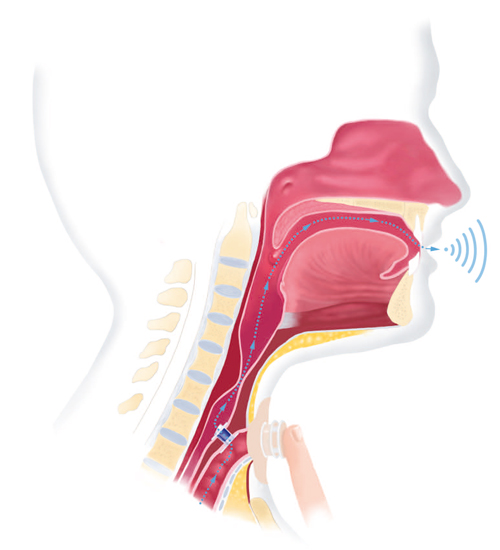
Voice prosthesis

Available methods for voice restoration:

- For tracheoesophageal speech, a voice prosthesis is placed in the tracheo-oesophageal puncture (TEP) created by the surgeon. The voice prosthesis is a one-way air valve that allows air to pass from the lungs/trachea to the esophagus when the stoma is covered, where the redirected air vibrates the esophageal tissue to produce a hoarse voice. The TEP and voice prosthesis combination allows individuals post-laryngectomy to have a voice to speak, while also avoiding aspiration of saliva, food or other liquids. Tracheoesophageal speech is considered more natural sounding than esophageal speech, but voice quality differs from person to person.
- For speech using an electrolarynx, an electrolarynx is an external device that is placed against the neck and creates vibration that the speaker then articulates. The sound has been characterized as mechanical and robotic.
- For esophageal speech, the speaker pushes air into the esophagus and then pushes it back up, articulating speech sounds to speak. This method is time-consuming and difficult to learn and is less frequently used by laryngectomees.
- For larynx transplants, a larynx from a cadaver donor is used as a replacement. This option is the most recent and is still very rare.

For individuals using tracheoesophageal or esophageal speech, botulinum toxin may be injected to improve voice quality when spasms or increased tone (hypertonicity) is present at the level of the pharyngoesophageal segment muscles. The amount of botulinum toxin administered unilaterally into two or three sites along the pharyngoesophageal segment varies from 15 to 100 units per injection. Positive voice improvements are possible after a single injection, however outcomes are variable. Dosages may need to be re-administered (individual-dependent) after a number of months, where effective results are expected to last for about 6 to 9 months.

=== Oral feeding ===
The laryngectomy surgery results in anatomical and physiological changes in the larynx and surrounding structures. Consequently, swallowing function can undergo changes as well, compromising the patient's oral feeding ability and nutrition. Patients may experience distress, frustration, and reluctance to eat out due to swallowing difficulties. Despite the high prevalence of post-operative swallowing difficulties in the first days following the laryngectomy, most patients recover swallowing function within 3 months. Laryngectomy patients do not aspirate due to the structural changes in the larynx, but they may experience difficulty swallowing solid food. They may also experience changes in appetite due to a significant loss in their senses of taste and smell.

In order to prevent the development of pharyngocutaneous fistula, it is common practice to reintroduce oral feeding as of the seventh to tenth day post-surgery, although the ideal timeline remains controversial. Pharyngocutaneous fistula typically develops before the reintroduction of oral feeding, as the pH level and presence of amylase in saliva is more harmful to tissues than other liquids or food. Whether the reintroduction of oral feeding at an earlier post-operative date decreases the risk of fistula remains unclear. However, early oral feeding (within 7 days of the operation) can be conducive to reduced length of hospital stay and earlier discharge from the hospital, entailing a decrease in costs and psychological distress.

=== Smell and taste rehabilitation ===
A total laryngectomy causes the separation of the upper air respiratory tract (pharyn, nose, mouth) and lower air respiratory tract (lungs, lower trachea). Breathing is no longer done through the nose (nasal airflow), which causes a loss/decrease of the sense of smell, leading to a decrease in the sense of taste. The Nasal Airflow Inducing Manoeuvre (NAIM), also known as the "Polite Yawning" manoeuvre, was created in 2000 and is widely accepted and used by speech-language pathologists in the Netherlands, while also becoming more widely used in Europe. This technique consists of increasing the space in the oral cavity while keeping the lips closed, simulating a yawn with a closed mouth by lowering the jaw, tongue and floor of the mouth. This causes a negative pressure in the oral cavity, leading to nasal airflow. The NAIM has been recognized as an effective rehabilitation technique to improve the sense of smell.

== Quality of life ==
People with a partial laryngectomy are more likely to have a higher quality of life than individuals with a total laryngectomy. People having undergone total laryngectomy have been found to be more prone to depression and anxiety, and often experience a decrease in the quality of their social life and physical health.

Voice quality, swallowing and reflux are affected in both types, with the sense of smell and taste (hyposmia/anosmia and dysgeusia) also being affected in total laryngectomies (a complaint which is given very little attention by medical professionals). Partial or total laryngectomy can lead to swallowing difficulties (known as dysphagia). Dysphagia can have a significant effect on some patients' quality of life following surgery. Dysphagia poses challenges in eating and social involvement, often causing patients to experience increased levels of distress. This effect holds true even after the acute phase of recovery. More than half of patients who received total laryngectomy were found to experience restrictions in their food intake, specifically in what they can eat and how they can eat it. The diet limitations imposed by dysphagia can negatively impact a patient's quality of life, as it can be perceived as a form of participation restriction. Accordingly, these perceived restrictions are more commonly experienced by dysphasic laryngectomy patients compared to non-dysphasic laryngectomy patients. Therefore, it is important to consider dysphagia in short and long-term outcomes post-laryngectomy in order for patients to uphold a higher quality of life. Often, speech-language pathologists are involved in the process of prioritizing swallowing outcomes.

People receiving voice rehabilitation report best voice quality and overall quality of life when using a voice prosthesis as compared to esophageal speech or electrolarynx. Furthermore, individuals going through non-surgical therapy report a higher quality of life than those having undergone a total laryngectomy. Lastly, it is much more difficult for those using alaryngeal speech to vary their pitch, which particularly affects the social functioning of those speaking a tonal language.
