= Breathy voice =

Type of phonation

Breathy voiced

◌̤

◌ʱ

Encoding
- Entity (decimal): &#804;&#689;
- Unicode (hex): U+0324 U+02B1
Image

Breathy voice (also called murmured voice, whispery voice, soughing and susurration) is a phonation in which the vocal folds vibrate, as they do in normal (modal) voicing, but are adjusted to let more air escape, which produces a sighing-like sound. A simple breathy phonation [ɦ] can sometimes be heard as an allophone of English /h/ between vowels, such as in the word behind, for some speakers.

In the context of the Indo-Aryan languages like Sanskrit and Hindi and comparative Indo-European studies, breathy consonants are often called voiced aspirated, as in the Hindi and Sanskrit stops normally denoted bh, dh, ḍh, jh, and gh and the reconstructed Proto-Indo-European phonemes bʰ,dʰ,ǵʰ,gʰ,gʷʰ. From an articulatory perspective, that terminology is inaccurate, as breathy voice is a different type of phonation from aspiration. However, breathy and aspirated stops are acoustically similar in that in both cases there is a delay in the onset of full voicing. In the history of several languages, like Greek and some varieties of Chinese, breathy stops have developed into aspirated stops.

== Classification and terminology ==
There is some confusion as to the nature of murmured phonation. The International Phonetic Alphabet (IPA) and authors such as Peter Ladefoged equate phonemically contrastive murmur with breathy voice in which the vocal folds are held with lower tension (and farther apart) than in modal voice, with a concomitant increase in airflow and slower vibration of the glottis. In that model, murmur is a point in a continuum of glottal aperture between modal voice and breath phonation (voicelessness). Others, such as Laver, Catford, Trask and the authors of the Voice Quality Symbols (VoQS), equate murmur with whispery voice in which the vocal folds or, at least, the anterior part of the vocal folds vibrates, as in modal voice, but the arytenoid cartilages are held apart to allow a large turbulent airflow between them. In that model, murmur is a compound phonation of approximately modal voice plus whisper. It is possible that the realization of murmur varies among individuals or languages. The IPA uses the term "breathy voice", but VoQS uses the term "whispery voice". Both accept the term "murmur", popularised by Ladefoged.

== Transcription ==
A stop with breathy release or a breathy nasal is transcribed in the IPA as [bʱ], [dʱ], [ɡʱ], [mʱ] etc. or as [b̤], [d̤], [ɡ̤], [m̤] etc. Breathy vowels are most often written [a̤], [e̤], etc. Indication of breathy voice by using subscript diaeresis was approved in or before June 1976 by members of the council of International Phonetic Association.

In VoQS, the notation {Ṿ} is used for whispery voice (or murmur), and {V̤} is used for breathy voice. Some authors, such as Laver, suggest the alternative transcription ⟨ḅạɾ⟩ (rather than IPA ⟨b̤a̤ɾ⟩) as the correct analysis of Gujarati /bɦaɾ/, but it could be confused with the replacement of modal voicing in voiced segments with whispered phonation, conventionally transcribed with the diacritic ⟨◌̣⟩.

== Methods of production ==
There are several ways to produce breathy sounds such as [ɦ]. One is to hold the vocal folds apart, so that they are lax as they are for [h], but to increase the volume of airflow so that they vibrate loosely. A second is to bring the vocal folds closer together along their entire length than in voiceless [h], but not as close as in modally voiced sounds such as vowels. This results in an airflow intermediate between [h] and vowels, and is the case with English intervocalic /h/. A third is to constrict the glottis, but separate the arytenoid cartilages that control one end. This results in the vocal folds being drawn together for voicing in the back, but separated to allow the passage of large volumes of air in the front. This is the situation with Hindi.

The distinction between the latter two of these realizations, vocal folds somewhat separated along their length (breathy voice) and vocal folds together with the arytenoids making an opening (whispery voice), is phonetically relevant in White Hmong (Hmong Daw).

== Phonological property ==
A number of languages use breathy voicing in a phonologically contrastive way. Many Indo-Aryan languages, such as Hindi, typically have a four-way contrast among plosives and affricates (voiced, breathy, tenuis, aspirated) and a two-way contrast among nasals (voiced, breathy). The Nguni languages within the southern branch of the Bantu languages, including Phuthi, Xhosa, Zulu, Southern Ndebele and Swazi, also have contrastive breathy voice. In the case of Xhosa, there is a four-way contrast analogous to Indic in oral clicks, and similarly a two-way contrast among nasal clicks, but a three-way contrast among plosives and affricates (breathy, aspirated, and ejective), and two-way contrasts among fricatives (voiceless and breathy) and nasals (voiced and breathy).

In some Bantu languages, historically breathy stops have been phonetically devoiced, but the four-way contrast in the system has been retained. In all five of the southeastern Bantu languages named, the breathy stops (even if they are realised phonetically as devoiced aspirates) have a marked tone-lowering (or tone-depressing) effect on the following tautosyllabic vowels. For this reason, such stop consonants are frequently referred to in the local linguistic literature as "depressor" stops.

Swazi, and to a greater extent Phuthi, display good evidence that breathy voicing can be used as a morphological property independent of any consonant voicing value. For example, in both languages, the standard morphological mechanism for achieving the morphosyntactic copula is to simply execute the noun prefix syllable as breathy (or "depressed").

In Portuguese, vowels after the stressed syllable can be pronounced with breathy voice.

Gujarati is unusual in contrasting breathy vowels and consonants: બાર /baɾ/ 'twelve', બહાર /ba̤ɾ/ 'outside', ભાર /bʱaɾ/ 'burden'.

Tsumkwe Juǀʼhoan makes the following rare distinctions : /nǂʱao/ fall, land (of a bird etc.); /nǂʱao̤/ walk; /nǂʱaˤo/ herb species; and /n|ʱoaᵑ/ greedy person; /n|oaʱᵑ/ cat.

Kurukh distinguishes /Ch, Cʰ, Cʰh/ with occasional minimal pairs like /dʱandha:/ "astonishment" and /dʱandʱa:/ "exertion". Clusters of voiced aspirates and /h/ are possible too as in /madʒʱhi:/ "middle" and /madʒʱis/ "zamindar's agent".

Breathy stops in some dialects of Punjabi lost their phonation, merging with voiceless and voiced stops in various positions, and a system of high and low tones developed in syllables that formerly had these sounds. Breathy voice can also be observed in place of debuccalized coda /s/ in some dialects of Spanish, e.g. [ˈtoðoɦ lo ˈθiɦneh som ˈblaŋkoh] for todos los cisnes son blancos.

== See also ==
- Aspirated consonant
- Creaky voice
- Guttural
- Index of phonetics articles
- Slack voice
- Voiced glottal fricative
- Whispering
