= Slack voice =

Type of pronunciation

Voiceless

◌̥

Encoding
- Entity (decimal): &#805;
- Unicode (hex): U+0325
Image

Slack voice (or lax voice) is the pronunciation of consonant or vowels with a glottal opening slightly wider than that occurring in modal voice. Such sounds are often referred to informally as lenis or half-voiced in the case of consonants. In some Chinese varieties, such as Wu, and in a few Austronesian languages, the 'intermediate' phonation of slack stops confuses listeners of languages without these distinctions, so that different transcription systems may use ⟨p⟩ or ⟨b⟩ for the same consonant. In Xhosa, slack-voiced consonants have usually been transcribed as breathy voice. Although the IPA has no dedicated diacritic for slack voice, the voiceless diacritic (the under-ring) may be used with a voiced consonant letter, though this convention is also used for partially voiced consonants in languages such as English.

Wu Chinese "muddy" consonants are slack voice word-initially, the primary effect of which is a slightly breathy quality of the following vowel.

	Bilabial			Alveolar			Velar		
	IPA	Wu	gloss	IPA	Wu	gloss	IPA	Wu	gloss
slack voice	[b̥ʌ̀ʔ]	白	'white'	[d̥ǐ]	地	'earth'	[ɡ̊ə̀ʔ]	個	(possessive particle)
tenuis	[pʌ́ʔ]	百	'hundred'	[tíʔ]	的	(a grammatical particle)	[kóʔ]	角	'corner'
aspirated	[pʰʌ́ʔ]	拍	'to strike'	[tʰî]	天	'sky'	[kʰʌ́ʔ]	客	'guest'

Javanese contrasts slack and stiff voiced bilabial, dental, retroflex, and velar stops.

	Bilabial		Dental Stop		Dental Affricate		Retroflex		Velar	
phonation	IPA	gloss	IPA	gloss	IPA	gloss	IPA	gloss	IPA	gloss
stiff voice	[paku]	'nail'	[tamu]	'guest'	[tsariʔ]	'sheet (of paper)'	[ʈiʈiʔ]	'little'	[kali]	'river'
slack voice	[b̥aku]	'standard'	[d̥amu]	'blow'	[d̥z̥arit]	(type of women's clothing)	[ɖ̥isiʔ]	'first'	[ɡ̊ali]	'dig'

Parauk contrasts slack voicing in its vowels. The contrast is between "slightly stiff" and "slightly breathy" vowels; the first are between modal and stiff voice, while the latter are captured by slack voice.
