= Esophageal speech =

Airstream mechanism for speech involving the esophagus

Œ

Encoding
- Entity (decimal): &#338;
- Unicode (hex): U+0152

Esophageal speech, also known as esophageal voice, is an airstream mechanism for speech that involves oscillation of the esophagus. This contrasts with traditional laryngeal speech, which involves oscillation of the vocal folds. In esophageal speech, pressurized air is injected into the upper esophagus and then released in a controlled manner to create the airstream necessary for speech.

The Voice Quality Symbol for esophageal speech is Œ.

== Clinical ==
Esophageal speech is a skill that can help patients to communicate after a laryngectomy, the most common surgery used for the treatment of laryngeal cancer. In the operation, the larynx and the vocal cords are removed completely. After this, the end of the trachea is sewn onto the edge of an opening cut out at the lower part of the neck, creating an opening (stoma) the patient will breathe from and cough out mucus from. This hole is called a tracheostoma; the patient uses it to breathe through and cough through after the operation.

== Character ==
The air moves from outside the body through the tracheostoma directly to the lungs, without passing through the upper respiratory organs of the nose, mouth, and throat. Because it bypasses the vocal folds, speech can be severely impaired, and the development of an esophageal voice becomes necessary. Esophageal speech is produced without an artificial larynx, and is achieved by pumping air from the mouth into the upper esophagus. The esophagus is slightly expanded. The air is then released in a regulated manner through the mouth, with simultaneous articulation of words. Vibration of the pharyngoesophageal sphincter replaces vibration of the glottis to produce the esophageal voice.

Many people learn a basic form of esophageal speech as children, when they speak words while burping, e.g. in competitions with friends to see who can say more of the alphabet during a burp.

Esophageal speech is quieter and more strenuous than laryngeal speech, and fewer words can be produced successively. Good esophageal speakers can produce an average of 5 words per breath and 120 words per minute. Very good esophageal speakers speak very similarly to TEP speakers.

Because of the large, vibrating pharyngo-esophageal segment, the pitch of esophageal speech is very low—between 50 and 100 Hz. In esophageal speech, pitch and intensity correlate: a low-pitched voice is produced with low intensity and a high-pitched voice is produced with high intensity. The production of the latter is more exhausting.

The voice of a speaker without a larynx sometimes has what appears to be a nasal tone to it, even though the nasal passage is no longer connected in a post-surgery laryngectomy patient. In other esophageal speakers, the tone is more similar to a deep belch.

Worcestershire Acute Hospitals Trust in England have a guidance leaflet that explains the process and how to achieve speech.

== Tracheoesophageal puncture ==
Tracheo-esophageal speech

Ю

Encoding
- Entity (decimal): &#1070;
- Unicode (hex): U+042E

Another option for restoring speech after a laryngectomy is the tracheoesophageal puncture or TEP. In this simple surgical procedure, a small puncture is made between the trachea and the esophagus, and a one-way air valve is inserted. This air supply can be used to cause vibrations of the pharyngoesophageal sphincter in a similar manner to esophageal speech. This surgical procedure may occur during the laryngectomy (primary TEP) or after a period of time (secondary TEP).

The prosthesis is placed approximately 10–14 days post operation by a certified speech language pathologist (SLP) who specializes in ENT work. During the placement of a prosthesis, the SLP measures the depth of the puncture, chooses the correct prosthesis, and inserts it with a loading device (the entire process can occur in 30–45 minutes pending complications). Patients return for the puncture to be resized every few months after surgery. When the puncture site stops changing sizes, then a more permanent prosthesis can be placed that will last approximately 6–12 months (indwelling prosthesis). Patients may choose this route, in which case they will return to the SLP for placement every 6–12 months, or may choose a low pressure, or duckbill prosthesis that they can change independently at home every few months. This option has become increasingly popular in the past 10 years, as in many cases intelligible voicing may be achieved within minutes of placement of the prosthesis. Some of the advantages to tracheoesophageal puncture are a higher success rate at about 95% of vocal rehabilitation and a much faster time frame compared to esophageal speech.

== Electrolarynx ==
Electrolaryngeal speech

И

Encoding
- Entity (decimal): &#1048;
- Unicode (hex): U+0418

An electrolarynx is a handheld device which is held against the throat and provides vibrations to allow speech. Electrolarynges may be used immediately post-surgery with an oral adapter (the neck being too tender right after surgery). Esophageal and electrolaryngeal speech (speech with an electrolarynx) may take weeks or months of training for patients to achieve functional voicing.

== See also ==
- Alaryngeal speech
