= Paul Poovathingal =

- Also known as: Padum Pathiri, Singing Priest
- Born: P.P.Paul; 1961 (age 64–65)
- Origin: Thrissur, Kerala, India
- Genres: Indian classical music playback singing Music Director Vocologist
- Occupations: Singer, composer, priest
- Years active: 1992–present
- Website: http://www.chetanavocology.com, http://www.thesingingpriest.com

Paul Poovathingal (born 1961), popularly known as the 'Padum Pathiri' or 'singing priest of India', is a carnatic music (Indian classical music) vocalist, composer and lyricist and is the first vocologist in India. He is an ordained priest in the religious congregation of the Carmelites of Mary Immaculate (CMI). He has composed around 1000 songs and released 35 music albums. He is a disciple of the legendary Carnatic musician and playback singer Padmabhushan K. J. Yesudas and of Chandramana Narayan Namboothiri. He is the first Indian Christian priest in the world to earn PhD in Carnatic music. He has performed classical music before A.P.J. Abdul Kalam, President of India and before Bharat Ratna M.S. Subbulakshmi.

== Spirituality and music ==
He focuses on the spiritual dimension of Indian classical music. He is also a proponent of music yoga (nada yoga) and advocates regular practice of pranayama to improve voice and general well-being. He also promotes religious harmony through the medium of music. His music repertoire encompasses devotional songs based on Christian, Muslim and Hindu religious themes. His music compositions are based on carnatic music melody (raga) using the Carnatic musical scale (swara). They have a humanistic and universal appeal. According to Poovathingal, "music is a bridge between all religions".

Inculturation of Music in Church in India
He has been an exponent of 'inculturation' or the process to express Christian faith through indigenous art forms, adapting indigenous cultural expressions. His research was in the field of ethnomusicology and focused on carnatic music and Christianity. He has popularised Indian Christian themes in Carnatic music. He introduced raga-based chanting in Christian liturgical music in Kerala and India.

== Education and career ==
Poovathingal learnt music, during his school years, from CC Chummar, a musician of Viyyur, Thrissur. He used to win prizes in music competitions. He started studying Indian classical music at the age of 17 under Sodharan Bhagavathar of Varandarappilly, Thrissur. He started musical compositions while studying in the seminary. While studying in Christ College, Bangalore and Dharmaram Vidyapeeth, Bangalore, he continued his music practice under Vidwan VK Krishnamurthy. He completed his priestly formation and studies in philosophy and theology and was ordained a priest in 1990. In 1996, Tarangini Music produced music album 'Snehasarovaram' with 8 Christian devotional songs composed by him and sung by K J Yesudas and Sujata. In 1992 he joined the Sangeeth Siromani Course in Delhi University and continued his studies in music in Delhi University earning M.A. Music Degree with distinction and earning the gold medal. In Delhi, he learnt music from T.N.Krishnan, T. R. Subramaniam, Leela Omcheri, Guruvayoor T. V. Manikandan, Vasanthi Rao, Radha Venkitachalam, Deepti etc. He continued his studies in Carnatic Music during 1996–2004 period and obtained M.Phil. and PhD in Carnatic Music from University of Madras. In Chennai, he also learned music from Vaikom Jayachandran. His doctoral thesis submitted in 2003 was guided by Karaikudi Subaramanian, and titled 'Carnatic Music and Christianity'. He studied vocology in Columbia University in 2003 and at the National Center for Voice and Speech, Denver, Colorado in 2006.

As a music researcher, he has published 11 research papers on various aspects of Karnatic Music and its relation to religion, philosophy and Christianity.

== Indian classical music concerts ==
He has staged Indian classical music performances in USA, Canada, European countries, UAE, Bahrain, South Africa and India. His musical concerts have been widely acclaimed. Paul Poovathingal performed before A.P.J. Abdul Kalam, President of India, at the Rastrapati Bhavan, New Delhi on 11 June 2007. He was accompanied by Prof Abdul Aziz on the violin, Guruvayur Sanoj on the mridangam and Shornur Rajesh on the ghatam (a pot-shaped percussion instrument). He started the concert with 'Vatapi Ganapathim' in Hamsadhvani (in praise of Ganesha, the Hindu deity symbolising the power of the Supreme Being to remove all obstacles and ensure success in one's endeavours, and also symbolising the conquest of one's ego). This was followed by 'Salathullah Salamullah' (a song in praise of Allah) in Anandha Bhairavi ragam. He then sang 'Sree Yesu Natham' in Abhogi ragam. He also sang the song 'Jai ho, Jai Ho Bharatmata Ki', a national integration song evoking patriotism, in 'Kalyani' ragam. He ended the concert with the song 'Loka Samastha Sukhino Bhavanthu' (an invocation for harmony in all creation) in 'Madhyamavathi ragam'. Abdul Kalaam referred to their musical troupe as a 'national integration team' uniting religions and hearts.

== Chetana Sangeet Natya Academy ==
The Chetana group of Institutions for Performing Arts in Thrissur, Kerala, India, is managed by the CMI Congregation. Chetana Sangeet Natya Academy, Thrissur was founded by Poovathingal in April 2005. It was inaugurated by K J Yesudas and blessed by Cardinal Vithayathil. Currently he functions as Director of the academy.

In February 2007, he produced Arnos Pathiri's Puthenpana (Life of Christ) using Indian Classical Dance form (Bharata Natyam and Mohiniattam) and Karnatic Music. He provided the concept and composed the music along with Abdul Azeez. The dance was choreographed by Kalamandalam Shobana Sajeev Kumar and Kalamandalam Husnabanu. The music was sung by Kalamandalam Rajeev. The dance was presented by teachers and students of Chetana Sangeet Natya Academy.

=== Chetana Music College ===
In 2007, Chetana Music College, Thrissur was inaugurated by K.J. Yesudas. The college is currently affiliated to the University of Madras. Poovathingal is the founder-Principal of Chetana Music College.

=== Chetanotsavam ===
Poovathingal has been organising Chetanotsavam, a national music and dance festival, at Chetana Sangeeth Natya Academy, Thrissur since 2005. Chetanotsavam-2010 was a two-day music and dance festival organised by Chetana Sangeet Natya Academy and Chetana Music College in Thrissur. The highlights of the festival included a two-hour Carnatic music concert by Mavelikkara P. Subramaniam, a kuchipudi dance performance by Sreelakshmi Govardhan and a contemporary dance by a Mexican artiste Abril Gomez.

== Chetana National Institute of Vocology ==
Paul Poovathingal founded Chetana National Institute of Vocology in Thrissur, Kerala, India in 2005. The Institute of Vocology is the first of its kind in India. Prof Ingo Titze (known as the father of vocology) is an advisor to the Board of the institute. The institute has been conducting certificate courses and seminars on vocology. The institute also has a voice clinic run by Poovathingal.

=== Voice clinic ===
Poovathingal is a pioneering vocologist of India, helping those who have voice problems. His voice clinics and vocology seminars help to guide musicians, actors, teachers, managers, speakers, lawyers and anyone who uses voice, to improve voice delivery.
Fr. Paul Poovathingal says: "Voice is a gift from God. Every voice is unique and distinct. Voice is an inseparable part of human personality."

== Recognition and awards ==
He has received the awards listed below:

- Fr.Paul was honoured By Dr.A.P.J.Abdul Kalam, President Of India at Rashtrapati Bhavan( President's House) 2007
- Saraswathi Millennium Award (2006) from the Saraswathi Trust, New York City.
- Rio Grande Puraskaram (2007) from Indian Cultural Association, McAllen, Texas, USA.
- Kerala (India) Catholic Bishops Conference Award (2008) for contribution to Christian classical music.
- Kala Ratna Award (2009) from Kala Sadan, Thrissur, India.
- Senior Fellowship award from Cultural Ministry, Govt. of India, New Delhi
- Kerala Sangeetha Nataka Akademi Award (2014) for Carnatic Music (Indian Classical)
- Maryvijayam Award, Thrissur, Kerala 2015
- Sander K. Thomas Cultural Award, Thrissur, Kerala 2015
- Thrichur Archdiocesan media Award, Thrissur, Kerala 2018
- J.C. Daniel Kalaratna Award 2019
- Dr.Suvarna Nalappat Trust Award, Guruvayoor 2019
- Indo-American Press Club International Award, Houston, USA 2019
- Fr.Paul was nominated as a member Fine Arts Faculty( advisory Board) of Malayalam University, Thirur, Kerala
