= Muhammad Nasser =

Muhammad Nasser (Arabic: محمد ناصر), and other variants using "Al-" (ال), "Abu-" (أبو), or "bin" (بن), may refer to:

== Academics ==
- Mohammed Abu Naser (1921–2004), Bangladeshi academic
- Mohammad Jibran Nasir (born 1987), Pakistani civil rights activist and lawyer
- Mohamed Nasser Kotby (born 1937), Egyptian professor

== Politicians ==
- Mohamad Nasir (born 1960), Indonesian politician and professor
- Mohamed Nasir (1916–1997), Malaysian politician
- Mohammad Nasser Saghaye-Biria (born 1958), Iranian imam and politician
- Mohd Nasir Hashim (born 1947), Malaysian politician
- Mohammed Nasser Al-Sanousi (born 1938), Kuwaiti politician

== Sportspeople ==
- Muhammad Nasir (born 1937), Pakistani boxer
- Mohammad Nasir, Afghan cricketer
- Mohammed Nasser (footballer, born 1988), Emirati footballer
- Mohamed El-Naser, Libyan swimmer
- Mohamed Nasir Abbas (born 1996), Qatari athlete
- Mohammad Nasser Afash (born 1966), Syrian footballer
- Mohamed Naser Elsayed Elneny (born 1992), Egyptian footballer
- Mohamad Naser Al-Sayed (born 1981), Qatari chess player
- Mohammed Nasser Shakroun (born 1984), Iraqi footballer
- Mo Nasir (born c. 1986), Welsh boxer

== Other people ==
- Muhammad Nasiruddin Nasir (born 1997), Malaysian actor
- Mohammed Nasser Al Ahbabi, Emirati engineer and space administrator
- Mohammed Nasser Ahmed (born 1950), Yemeni major general
- Mohammed bin Nasser Al-Ajmi, Kuwaiti writer
- Muhammad bin Nasir (died 1728), Omani imam
- Muhammad Nasir Abdul Aziz, Singaporean convicted criminal

== See also ==
- Abdelkarim Hussein Mohamed Al-Nasser, Saudi Arabian terrorist
- Hala Mohammad al-Nasser (born 1964), Minister of Housing and Construction for Syria
- Nafih Mohammed Naser, Indian education activist
- Mohamed Eid Naser Al-Bishi (born 1987), Saudi Arabian footballer
- Turki bin Mohammed bin Nasser bin Abdulaziz Al Saud (born 1969), Saudi Arabian prince
- Nasser Muhammad (disambiguation)
- Muhammad (name)
- Nasser (name)
