= Vocal warm-up =

Exercises to prepare the voice for use

Vocal warm-up demonstration from the United States Navy Band

A vocal warm-up is a series of exercises meant to prepare the voice for singing, acting, or other use.

Vocal warm-ups are essential exercises for singers to enhance vocal performance and reduce the sense of effort required for singing. Research demonstrates that engaging in vocal warm-ups can temporarily elevate vocal effort, which normalizes after a short rest, enhancing vocal readiness for performance.

== Description ==
Vocal warm-ups are intended to accomplish five things: a physical whole-body warm-up, preparing the breath, preparing the articulators and resonators, moving from the spoken register to the singing register (or an extended spoken register for acting), and preparing for the material that is going to be rehearsed or performed.

Physical whole-body warm-ups help prepare a singer or actor's body in many ways. Muscles all over the body are used when singing/acting. Stretching helps to activate and prepare the large muscle groups that take care of balance and posture, and the smaller muscle groups that are directly involved with breathing and facial articulation. Stretches of the abdomen, back, neck, and shoulders are important to avoid tension, which influences the sound of the voice through constriction of the larynx and/or breathing muscles. Actors (including opera singers or musical theatre performers) may need to do a more comprehensive physical warm-up if their role is demanding physically.

Preparing the breath involves not only stretching the many muscles involved with respiration, but preparing them to sustain exhalation during long singing/speaking passages. Specific training of the respiratory muscles is required for singers to take very quick deep breath and sustain their exhalation over many bars of music. A good vocal warm-up should include exercises such as inhaling for 4 counts, then exhaling for 8 counts (and slowly transitioning until the performer can inhale for 1 count and exhale for as long as possible); panting or puffing air are also used to engage in the intercostal muscles.

Vocal articulation is controlled by a variety of tissues, muscles, and structures (place of articulation), but can be basically understood as the effects of the lips, the teeth, and the tip of the tongue. Often we also try and use our jaw for articulation, which creates unnecessary tension in the facial muscles and tongue. A good vocal warm up will relax the jaw, while activating the lips and the tongue in a variety of exercises to stretch the muscles and prepare for the more defined vocal articulation that is required when singing or acting. These exercises may include tongue twisters, or the famous "me, may, ma, moh, moo" that many actors are seen doing in film.

Resonators are the hard and soft surfaces within the oral cavity that affect the sound waves produced during phonation. Hard surfaces, such as the hard palate, cannot be controlled by the singer, but soft surfaces, such as the soft palate, can be trained to change the timbre of the sound. A vocal warm up should include exercises which direct sound towards these hard and soft surfaces – these exercises can incorporate a variety of sound effects, including whoops, wails, and nasal sounds. Other exercises can help singers/actors be aware of lifting the soft palate, which can create a darker richer timbre when singing – an example would be simulating a sudden shocked gasp, and then maintaining the openness at the back of the mouth.

Changing pitch undoubtedly stretches the vocal muscles, and singing or projecting one's voice for acting requires a more strenuous use of these muscles. A good vocal warm-up should move the singer/actor from the spoken register (small pitch range, small dynamic range, colloquial diction) into the singing register (large pitch range, large dynamic range, and diction specific to the demands of the role or piece). This is often the largest and most complex part of the vocal warm-up, and requires a multitude of exercises. These exercises also provide voice training, and are sometimes called vocalises. These activities teach breath control, diction, blending, and balance. A vocalise /voʊkəˈliːz/ is a vocal exercise (often one suitable for performance) without words, which is sung on one or more vowel sounds.

Finally, a good vocal warm-up should prepare the specific material that is going to be rehearsed or performed (usually a vocal warm-up is a precursor to either rehearsal or performance). This could be as simple as doing some exercises in the key that is to be sung, or with the accent that an actor must use for their role. Certain difficult passages of the forthcoming repertoire might be broken down and used as an exercise, and any language requirements must be prepared (if the performer is singing in their non-native language, they will want to do exercises to prepare for the sounds and shapes which are required in that language).

When a vocal warm-up is led by a director (either musical or theatrical), it also provides an important opportunity to assess the vocal abilities of the singers/actors at hand without the distraction of the repertoire and to specifically train areas of weakness. For some, their director will be the only voice teacher they ever work with, so the vocal warm-up is the only time where they receive specific training for the muscles required by their craft.

== Vocalise ==
=== Classical music ===
Vocalises date back to the mid-18th century. Jean-Antoine Bérard's 1755 compilation L'art du chant includes a selection of songs without words (sans paroles) by composers such as Lully (1632–1687) and Rameau (1683–1764), chosen for their value as exercises in vocal technique. Accompanying the exercises are instructions on mastering the technical challenges they pose. By the 19th century, vocalises were commonly composed specifically for pedagogical purposes rather than being adapted from existing songs.

A related tradition of vocalises sprang up in the 19th century with wordless technical etudes set to piano accompaniment. This followed the fashion of the time of setting even the most mechanical of études to piano accompaniment with the thought that this would inspire the performer to execute the music more artistically.

In the early 20th century, many orchestral scores incorporated wordless choruses (especially female choruses) for coloristic effects, and such choruses may be found in works by Debussy, Ravel, Vaughan Williams, Holst, and in many film scores.

==== Notable examples ====
- Gabriel Fauré: Vocalise-étude (1906)
- Maurice Ravel: Vocalise-étude en forme de habanera, M.51, for voice and piano (1907)
- Igor Stravinsky: Pastorale for soprano (1907)
- Carl Nielsen: Symphony No. 3, Op. 27: second movement (1911)
- Frederick Delius: A Song of the High Hills (1911)
- Sergei Rachmaninoff: Vocalise, Op. 34, No. 14, for soprano (1912)
- Nikolai Medtner: Sonata-Vocalise, Op. 41, No. 1 (1922) and Suite-Vocalise, Op. 41, No. 2 (1927)
- Heitor Villa-Lobos: Bachianas Brasileiras No. 5: first movement (1938)
- Reinhold Glière: Concerto for Coloratura Soprano and Orchestra, Op. 82 (1943)
- John Corigliano: Vocalise, for soprano, electronics and orchestra (1999)
- Gilad Hochman: Night Winds, vocalise for soprano and piano (2015)

=== Jazz and world music ===
Vocalese (with the -ese suffix) refers to a type of jazz singing in which new words are created and sung to existing instrumental improvisations. Both The Swingle Singers and Jon Hendricks famously combined both these techniques. This style is pre-composed (i.e. not improvised); therefore, it is not to be confused with scat singing, which is wordless improvisation.

The 1929 gospel blues song "I Had a Good Father and Mother" by Washington Phillips has a vocalise as refrain.

In Indian classical music, the tradition of aakar is used as a vocal exercise before singing, and also to a certain extent adds to the singing and the melody.

== See also ==
- National Center for Voice and Speech
- Vocology – science and practice of voice habilitation
- Human voice
- Melisma
