= Anne-Maria Laukkanen =

Finnish researcher and professor

- Born: 1966 (age 59–60); Finland
- Education: University of Tampere, University of Helsinki
- Scientific career
- Fields: Speech technique, Vocology, Speech and voice research
- Thesis: On Speaking Voice Exercises (1995)

Anne-Maria Laukkanen (born 1966) is a Finnish researcher (1990–) and a permanent full professor (2001–) of speech technique and vocology at the University of Tampere.

She has supervised 12 doctoral dissertations and 23 master theses and is now supervising 7 doctoral dissertations. She is a peer reviewer in 23 international scientific journals.

Primary Research Interests: Voice quality in speech and singing, effects and bases of vocal exercises, effects and mechanisms of vocal loading, and applicability of various research methods in vocology.

Her textbook The Wonderful Human Voice: Fundamentals of Sound Use and Speech Technique, Evaluation, Measurement and Development has been used for university teaching in Finnish speech therapy and vocology since 1999.

== Education ==
Laukkanen studied at the University of Helsinki, where she obtained a Master of Arts in Phonetics in 1990, and a Licentiate in Phonetics in 1993. Laukkanen studied also at the University of Tampere, where she obtained PhD in Phoniatrics in 1995.

=== Thesis publications ===
- On speaking voice exercises – a study on the acoustic and physiological effects of speaking voice exercises applying manipulation of the acoustic-aerodynamic state of the supraglottic space and artificially modified auditory feedback. Acta Universitatis Tamperensis. Ser. A. Acta Universitatis Tamperensis ser A vol. 445. University of Tampere, Finland. 1995. ISBN 951-44-3762-4. (PhD Thesis)
- Emotionaaliseen painotukseen liittyvistä akustisista ja aerodynaamisista muuttujista – käänteissuodatusmenetelmää soveltava tutkimus. (Acoustic and Aerodynamic Variables Related to Emphatic Sentence Stress), University of Helsinki, Finland. 1992. (Phil. Lic. Thesis)
- Lauluäänen vibratosta – elektroglottografinen tutkimus perussävelkorkeuden vaihteluun liittyvästä äänilähdevarioinnista mahdollisena vibraton fysiologisen alkuperän ilmentäjänä. (Vibrato in Singing Voice – An electroglottographic study on fundamental frequencysynchronous waveform variation as a possible indicator of the background of F0 change. A study with material from singers and excised human larynges), University of Helsinki, Finland. 1989. (M.A. Thesis)

== Textbook ==
- Laukkanen, Anne-Maria & Leino, Timo (1999). Ihmeellinen ihmisääni – äänenkäytön ja puhetekniikan perusteet, arviointi, mittaaminen ja kehittäminen. (The Wonderful Human Voice – Fundamentals of Sound Use and Speech Technique, Evaluation, Measurement and Development), Helsinki: Gaudeamus, Finland. ISBN 951-662-782-X.

== Publications ==
- Leino, Timo & Laukkanen, Anne-Maria & Vojtech, Radolf: Leino, Timo; Laukkanen, Anne-Maria; Radolf, Vojtěch (2011). "Formation of the Actor's/Speaker's Formant – A Study Applying Spectrum Analysis and Computer Modeling". Journal of Voice. 25 (2): 150–158. doi:10.1016/j.jvoice.2009.10.002. PMID 20456915. Journal of Voice, March 2011;25:2:150–158. PMID 20456915.
- Leino, T.; Laukkanen, A. M.; Ilomäki, I.; Mäki, E. (2008). "Assessment of Vocal Capacity of Finnish University Students". Folia Phoniatrica et Logopaedica. 60 (4): 199–209. doi:10.1159/000133651. PMID 18487880. S2CID 38820635. Folia Phoniatrica et Logopaedica, August 2008;60:199–209. PMID 18487880.
- Laukkanen, A. M.; Syrjä, T.; Laitala, M.; Leino, T. (2004). "Effects of two-month vocal exercising with and without spectral biofeedback on student actors' speaking voice". Logopedics, Phoniatrics, Vocology. 29 (2): 66–76. doi:10.1080/14015430410034479. PMID 15260182. S2CID 20110965. Logopedics Phoniatrics Vocology, 2004;29:2:66–76. PMID 15260182.
- Waaramaa, Teija & Laukkanen, Anne-Maria & Leino, Timo: Student actors' expression of emotions on prolonged vowels. PEVOC 5, Graz 28–31 August 2003, Austria.
- Laukkanen, Anne-Maria & Syrjä, Tiina & Leino, Timo: "Effects of a two-month vocal exercising with and without spectral biofeedback on student actors' speaking voice". PEVOC 4, Stockholm 23–26 August 2001, Sweden.
- Leino, Timo & Laukkanen, Anne-Maria & Välikoski, Tuula-Riitta (eds.): "Kolme vuosikymmentä puhetekniikkaa ja vokologiaa Tampereen yliopistossa". (Three decades of speech technique and vocology at the University of Tampere). Vokologiaa, puheviestintää ja muuta puheentutkimusta – Juhlakirja Timo Leinolle (Vocology, Speech Communication and Other Speech Research Anniversary Book for Timo Leino). Department of Speech Technique, University of Tampere, Finland, 125 pages. 2001. ISBN 978-951-44-5111-9.
- Leino, Timo & Laukkanen, Anne-Maria & Kättö, Riitta & Ilomäki, Irma: Average fundamental frequency of Finnish female students in the 1970s and in the 1990s. International Association of Logopedics and Phoniatrics; Communication and its disorders a science in progress. Nijmegen Univ. Press. ISBN 978-90-5710-071-0. Proceedings of the 24th World Congress of the International Association of Logopedics and Phoniatrics – Communication and its disorders a science in progress. IALP August 23–27, 1998, Amsterdam, Nijmegen University Press. The Netherlands. Pages 60–62. ISBN 9057100711.
- Leino, Timo & Laukkanen, Anne-Maria: "Äänitysetäisyyden vaikutus puheäänen keskiarvospektriin". (Effect of recording distance on average speech spectrum). Fonetiikan päivät – Helsinki 1992, Papers from the 17th Meeting of Finnish Phoneticians, (Antti Iivonen, Reijo Aulanko, eds.) Publications of the Department of Phonetics, University of Helsinki, Finland, 36. pp. 117–130, 1993. ISBN 978-951-45-6408-6
