= Étienne Lombard =

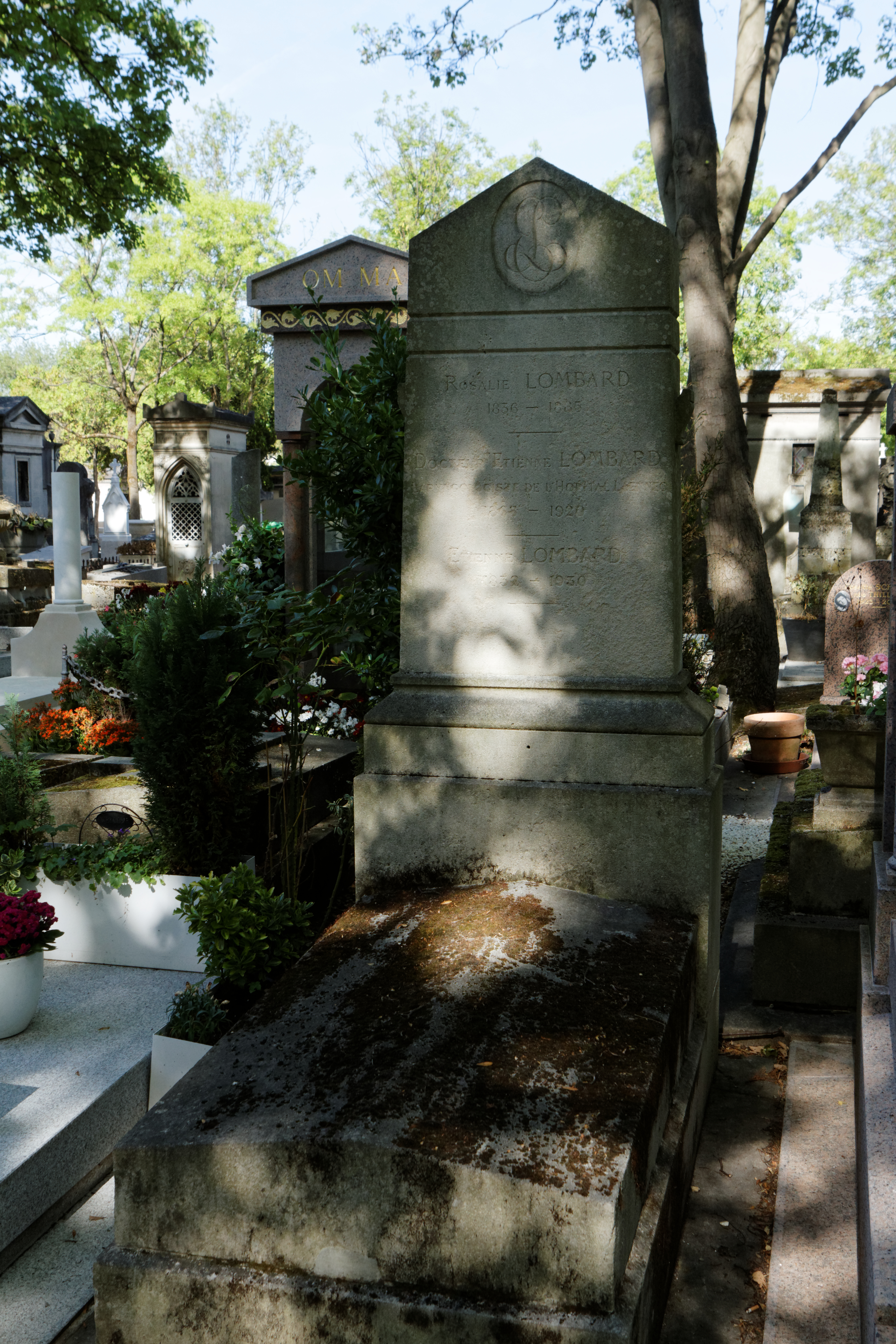
Tomb at the Père-Lachaise Cemetery.

Étienne Lombard (French pronunciation: [etjɛn lɔ̃baʁ]; 1869–1920) was a French otolaryngologist and surgeon who discovered the Lombard effect in which a person's voice is involuntarily raised when he speaks in a loud environment.

He was at Lariboisière Hospital, the first "oto-rhino-laryngologiste des Hopitaux" in France. He developed new surgical techniques and a new form of bone forceps. During the First World War, he researched the effects of air blasts upon 600 aviators but was unable to continue that research because of an illness, which would result in his early death.

The "symptom of the raised voice" was discovered in 1909. It was made possible by the invention of a device by the Viennese physician Robert Bárány that delivered an intense noise to only one ear and so allowed the monaural examination of the other ear. Using that device, Lombard asked a person to start talking in conversation while noise was heard. Lombard found that when the noise began, the person spoke more loudly, and when the noise stopped, the voice returned to a normal level.^{pp. 678–680}

The finding was reported to the French Academy of Sciences in August 1909 and the following year in April to the French Academy of Medicine. However, in 1910, German publications attributed the discovery to Bárány, which led to a dispute in print between them. Priority was established when an English physician, Donald Schearer, described how he carried news of the discovery from Paris to Vienna in November 1909.^{pp. 677–678} Bárány received the Nobel Prize in Physiology or Medicine in 1914 for other work.

Lombard's discovery is important for four reasons.

- It provides a means of detecting malingering by simulated hearing loss.
- It underlies research into speech communication in noise (an important practical problem).
- It helps researchers understand how imitation and speaking are altered by auditory feedback.
- It identifies a role in speech of processes involving servomechanism.

He is buried in the Père Lachaise Cemetery in Paris.
