= Mohamed Nasser Kotby =

Egyptian academic

Mohamed Nasser Kotby MD, M.Ch, FRCS(AH)(ED)
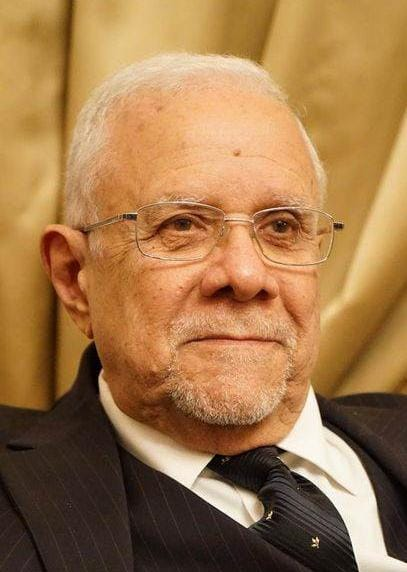
- Born: December 1, 1937 (age 88); Cairo, Kingdom of Egypt (now Egypt)
- Education: Ain Sham University, Egypt; Oslo University, Norway; University of Gothenburg, Sweden
- Occupations: Professor Emeritus, Faculty of Medicine, Ain Shams University.
- Known for: Founding Phoniatrics and Logopedics specialty in Egypt and the Middle East
- Awards: SWE Order of the Polar Star (after 1975) - Knight 1st Class BAR
- Honours: 1) The International Federation of ORL Societies (IFOS) Gold Medal in Otolaryngology 2) The international association of communication sciences and disorders ( IALP) Longstanding International Award

Mohamed Nasser Kotby (Arabic: د/محمد ناصر قطبي; born 1 December 1937), is an Egyptian professor emeritus of otorhinolarygology and phoniatrics at Faculty of Medicine, Ain Sham University. He is considered the founder of the Phoniatrics and Logopedics in Egypt and the Middle East. Kotby published many papers in scholarly journals and textbooks. His works investigated different topics e.g. vocology, dysarthria, dysphasia and child language. He is a member of many professional societies, national, regional and international. He was elected as president of Collegium Medicorum Theatri [CoMeT], Pan African Federation of Oto-Rhino-Laryngological Societies [PAFOS], Collegium Oto-Rhino-Laryngologicum Amicitiae Sacrum [CORLAS], International Association of Logopedics and Phoniatrics (IALP), International Federation of Oto-Rhino-Laryngological Societies (IFOS). He is now president of the Egyptian Society of Phoniatrics and Logopedics (ESPL). In addition to his scientific work, Kotby is a certified guide in Egyptology. He wrote a series of books exploring history of Egypt.

== Early life and education ==
Kotby was born on the 1st of December in 1937 in Cairo, Egypt. He spent his childhood in Helmieyt el Zeitoun, Cairo district. He graduated in Faculty of Medicine, Ain Shams University in 1960. He did diplomas in surgery and otorhinolaryngology in 1963 and 1964, respectively. He did his PhD thesis on electromyography of laryngeal muscles in 1967 in Egypt. Later he moved to Norway, where he did a specialization degree in clinical neurophysiology at Oslo University in 1970. He then moved to Sweden and got another specialization degree in Phoniatrics from University of Gothenburg in 1973. He went back to Egypt in 1974 where he established the first Phoniatrics and Logopedics Unit in Egypt and the Middle East, he led the unit for more than 20 years. In 1998, he became a Professor Emeritus at the Department of Otolaryngology, Faculty of Medicine, Ain Shams University. He was a visiting professor in many universities in Japan, Norway, Saudi Arabia.

== Basic and clinical research ==
Kotby's research interest was focused on understanding the function of the small internal laryngeal muscles and the coordination between them. His PhD thesis focused on a description of standardized method for per-cutaneous Laryngeal electromyography (LEMG) investigating the action of the internal laryngeal muscles. He followed this by a number of studies trying to delineate the contribution of the different muscles and its peripheral neural control. Kotby published a series of works on the histopathology of benign lesion of the human vocal fold, in both light microscopy and ultra-structure. He and his research group introduced the term "Minimal Associated Pathological Lesions (MAPLs)" of the vocal fold to describe a group of benign non-neoplastic, non-inflammatory lesions probably arising as a result of vocal trauma. He improved and standardized clinical protocols for conducting Laryngeal electromyography in patients. He established clinical protocols for quantitative and qualitative assessment of voice and speech disorders. Kotby has developed and standardized the application of the Smith Accent Method in voice and speech therapy. He and his team applied the Accent Method in treatment of many non-organic voice disorders. He published a practical text describing this method and its application.

== Honors and awards ==
Kotby was knighted by King Carl XVI Gustaf as a knight of the Royal North Start Order, First Class, 1990.

- 2019: The Long standing International Award from the International Association of Logopedics and Phoniatrics (IALP).
- 2003: Member of the Royal Physiographic Society of Lund, Sweden
- 1997: The gold medal from the International Federation of ORL Societies (IFOS).
- 1980: Gutzmann Medal for scientific achievement and international cooperation in the field of Phoniatrics, Humboldt University

== Membership of societies ==
Kotby was elected president of the major professional and scientific societies in the fields of Otolaryngology and communicative disorders (The Collegium Medicorum Theatri [CoMet] in 1992, The Collegium Oto-Rhino-Laryngologicum Amicitiae Sacrum [CORLAS] for 2 years from 1992 to 1994, the Pan African Federation of Oto-Rhino-Laryngological Societies [PAFOS] for 2 years from 1992 to 1994, The International Association for Logopedics and Phoniatrics [IALP], for 3 years from 1995 to 1998, The International Federation of Oto-Rhino-Laryngological Societies [IFOS] for 3 years from 2002 to 2005, The Egyptian Society for the History of Medicine, from 2003 up till the present time). He was also elected vice president of the International Society for the History of Medicine [ISHM], in the period from 2009 to 2012. In 1999, Professor Kotby received ad hominem membership of The Royal College of Surgeons of Edinburgh.

== Personal life and family ==
Kotby is relative to Dr. Mohamed Helmy. He only accepted to receive the Righteous Among the Nations recognition in the name of his late great uncle Mohamed Helmy in a neutral ground at the German Ministry of Foreign Affairs in Berlin.

== Extracurricular activities ==
Out of interest in travel, culture and arts, Professor Kotby has travelled the world; from pole to pole. He traveled on major railways in the world (Canada Pacific, Trans Siberia, Vostok train, Rovos Train from Cape Town to Dar Essalam, Eastern and Oriental Express from Bangkok to Singapore, Palace on Wheels [India], Green Train Line, Curitiba, Brazil, Oslo / Bergen train). He visited and explored major national parks in North and South America, Africa, and Japan. He visited Egyptology collections in museums around the world (Cairo, Turin, Leiden, New Museum- Berlin, Louvre, Metropolitan). He visited art collections in major museums around the world (The Picture Gallery, in Berlin, The National Gallery, in London, The National Gallery, in Washington, Hermitage, St. Petersburg, The Art Gallery, in Dresden). He has also attended major operatic and music festivals in Bayreuth, Salzburg, Glyndebourne, Edinburgh, Granada, Torre del Lago, Bregenz, Savonlinna, Santa Fe.

== Non-scientific work ==
Kotby is said to speak 6 languages and is a certified guide in Egyptology in 5 languages. He wrote a series of books telling the history of Egypt, and on the Quran: "Do They Master Quran".
