= NCVS =

NCVS can stand for:

- The Northern Cities Vowel Shift
- The National Crime Victimization Survey
- The National Center for Voice and Speech
