= Timo Leino =

Finnish scientist

- Born: May 16, 1936; Finland
- Died: January 18, 2014 (aged 77); Tampere Finland
- Education: Finnish Speech Institute, University of Helsinki
- Known for: Long-term average speech spectrum (LTAS)
- Scientific career
- Fields: Speech technique, Speech analysis
- Workplaces: University of Tampere

Timo Leino (May 16, 1936 – January 18, 2014) founded the Department of Speech Technique in the University of Tampere in 1974. He was the head of department from 1974 to 2001. Leino pioneered speech analysis in Finland. He worked to develop speech education in Finland.

== Publications ==
=== Academic theses ===
- (1967) Rytmijaksoanalyysi Volter Kilven kertomuksesta Vierniemen Jooseppi (Rhythm analysis of Volter Kilpi's story Joseph of Vierniemi). University of Helsinki, Department of Phonetics, Finland, (Master's thesis)
- (1976) Hyvän äänen spektripiirteitä (Spectral features of good human voice). University of Helsinki, Department of Phonetics, Logopedics, Finland, (Licentiate thesis)

=== Textbook ===
- Laukkanen, Anne-Maria & Leino, Timo (1999). Ihmeellinen ihmisääni: äänenkäytön ja puhetekniikan perusteet, arviointi, mittaaminen ja kehittäminen. (The Wonderful Human Voice: Fundamentals of Sound Use and Speech Technique, Evaluation, Measurement and Development), Helsinki:Gaudeamus, Finland. ISBN 951-662-782-X.

=== Articles ===
- Leino, Timo: Rytmijaksoanalyysi Volter Kilven kertomuksesta Vierniemen Jooseppi. T. Leino. 1967. (Rhythm analysis of Volter Kilpi's story Joseph of Vierniemi). University of Helsinki, Department of Phonetics, Finland, 1967.
- Leino, Timo: "Äänen kvaliteetin tutkimisesta reaaliaikaisen keskiarvoisspektrin avulla". (Investigating Human Voice Quality with Real-Time Average Spectrum). Papers in Phonetics – Tampere 1974, Department of Speech Technique, University of Tampere, Finland, pp. 93–114, 1975.
- Leino, Timo: Hyvän äänen spektripiirteitä. T. Leino. 1976. (Spectral features of good human voice). University of Helsinki, Department of Phonetics, Logopedics, Finland, 1976.
- Leino, Timo: "Spektrihavaintoja yläsävellaulusta sekä samanaikaisesta laulusta ja vihellyksestä". (Spectral observations of the overtone song and the simultaneous singing and whistling). Papers from the 14th Meeting of Finnish Phoneticians. Papers in Speech Research (Pertti Hurme, Hannele Dufva, eds.) University of Jyväskylä, Finland, pp. 159–178, 1987. ISBN 951-679-741-5.
- Leino, Timo: "Keskimääräinen puhekorkeus". (Average pitch). Fonetiikan päivät – Oulu 1990, Papers from the 16th Meeting of Finnish Phoneticians, (Kari Suomi, eds.), Publications of the Department of Speech Therapy and Phonetics, University of Oulu, Finland, 5, pp. 33–51, 1991.
- Leino, Timo & Laukkanen, Anne-Maria: "Äänitysetäisyyden vaikutus puheäänen keskiarvospektriin". (Effect of recording distance on average speech spectrum). Fonetiikan päivät – Helsinki 1992, Papers from the 17th Meeting of Finnish Phoneticians, (Antti Iivonen, Reijo Aulanko, eds.) Publications of the Department of Phonetics, University of Helsinki, Finland, 36. pp. 117–130, 1993. ISBN 978-951-45-6408-6.
- Leino Timo: "Long-term-average spectrum study on speaking voice quality in male actors". In: Friberg A, Iwarsson J, Jansson E, Sundberg J, editors. Proceedings of the Stockholm Music Acoustics Conference (SMAC 93). Stockholm: Royal Swedish Academy of Music. 1994;79:206–210.
- Leino, Timo & Laukkanen, Anne-Maria & Kättö, Riitta & Ilomäki, Irma: "Average fundamental frequency of Finnish female students in the 1970s and in the 1990s". Proceedings of the 24th World Congress of the International Association of Logopedics and Phoniatrics – Communication and its disorders a science in progress. IALP August 23–27, 1998, Amsterdam, Nijmegen University Press. The Netherlands. Pages 60–62. ISBN 9057100711.
- Leino, Timo: "In search of "optimal pitch". The lowest possible tone as the reference in the evaluation of speaking pitch in Finnish speakers". Proceedings of the 24th World Congress of the International Association of Logopedics and Phoniatrics – Communication and its disorders a science in progress. IALP August 23–27, 1998, Amsterdam, Nijmegen University Press. The Netherlands. Pages 56–59. ISBN 9057100711.
- Leino, Timo: "Puhekorkeuden mittaaminen ja muutostarpeen arviointi". (Measurement of pitch and evaluation of the need for change). Äänen tutkiminen ja äänihäiriöiden ennaltaehkäisy. (Jaana Sellman, Anna-Maija Korpijaakko-Huuhka, T. Siirilä, eds.) Publications of the Finnish Logopedic-Phonetic Association 31, 1999: 41–49.
- Leino, Timo & Laukkanen, Anne-Maria & Välikoski, Tuula-Riitta (eds.): "Kolme vuosikymmentä puhetekniikkaa ja vokologiaa Tampereen yliopistossa". (Three decades of speech technique and vocology at the University of Tampere). Vokologiaa, puheviestintää ja muuta puheentutkimusta – Juhlakirja Timo Leinolle (Vocology, Speech Communication and Other Speech Research – Anniversary Book for Timo Leino). Department of Speech Technique, University of Tampere, Finland, 125 pages. 2001. ISBN 978-951-44-5111-9.
- Laukkanen, Anne-Maria & Syrjä, Tiina & Leino, Timo: "Effects of a two-month vocal exercising with and without spectral biofeedback on student actors' speaking voice". PEVOC 4, Stockholm 23–26 August 2001, Sweden.
- Waaramaa, Teija & Laukkanen, Anne-Maria & Leino, Timo: Student actors' expression of emotions on prolonged vowels. PEVOC 5, Graz 28–31 August 2003, Austria.
- Laukkanen, A. M.; Syrjä, T.; Laitala, M.; Leino, T. (2004). "Effects of two-month vocal exercising with and without spectral biofeedback on student actors' speaking voice". Logopedics, Phoniatrics, Vocology. 29 (2): 66–76. doi:10.1080/14015430410034479. PMID 15260182. S2CID 20110965. Logopedics Phoniatrics Vocology, 2004;29:2:66–76. PMID 15260182.
- Leino, T.; Laukkanen, A. M.; Ilomäki, I.; Mäki, E. (2008). "Assessment of Vocal Capacity of Finnish University Students". Folia Phoniatrica et Logopaedica. 60 (4): 199–209. doi:10.1159/000133651. PMID 18487880. Folia Phoniatrica et Logopaedica, August 2008;60:199–209. PMID 18487880.
- Leino, T. (2009). "Long-Term Average Spectrum in Screening of Voice Quality in Speech: Untrained Male University Students". Journal of Voice. 23 (6): 671–6. doi:10.1016/j.jvoice.2008.03.008. PMID 18619783. Journal of Voice, November 2009;23:6:671–676. PMID 18619783.
- Leino, Timo & Laukkanen, Anne-Maria & Vojtech, Radolf: Leino, Timo; Laukkanen, Anne-Maria; Radolf, Vojtěch (2011). "Formation of the Actor's/Speaker's Formant: A Study Applying Spectrum Analysis and Computer Modeling". Journal of Voice. 25 (2): 150–158. doi:10.1016/j.jvoice.2009.10.002. PMID 20456915. Journal of Voice, March 2011;25:2:150–158. PMID 20456915.
