= Aatto Sonninen =

Finnish physician and speech pathologist

Aatto Albanus Sonninen
- Born: 24 December 1922; Siilinjärvi, Finland
- Died: 31 March 2009 (aged 86); Jyväskylä, Finland
- Education: University of Helsinki, Medical School 1945–1950
- Scientific career
- Fields: Phoniatrics
- Workplaces: Helsinki University Hospital 1957–64, Central Hospital of Finland in Jyväskylä 1964–85, University of Jyväskylä 1968–85, Sibelius Academy 1990–95
- Thesis: The role of the external laryngeal muscles in length-adjustment of the vocal cords in singing (1956)

Aatto Albanus Sonninen (24 December 1922 – 31 March 2009) was a Finnish physician and speech and language pathologist known for his work in phoniatrics and logopedics.

== Education ==
Sonninen graduated from Kuopio Lyceum in 1942 and graduated as a Licentiate in Medicine in 1950. In Medicine and Surgery he received his doctorate in 1956, where he was also a specialist in speech and sound disorders and ear, nose and throat qualifications.

== Career ==
Aatto Albanus Sonnien worked at Helsinki University Hospital from 1957 to 1964 as a senior physician and chief physician (phoniatrics). From 1964 to 1985 he was the head of the phoniatric department at Central Hospital of Central Finland in Jyväskylä. Furthermore, he was a senior lecturer in logopedics, in clinical speech research and phoniatrics at University of Jyväskylä during 1968–1985.

Sonnenin was a professor of phoniatrics and also associate professor of logopedics in the University of Helsinki in 1983.

Professor's Honorary Title Sonninen was awarded in 1981. He retired in 1986.

== Marriage ==
Sonninen married eeva ( a teacher and speech therapist ) in 1946.

== Awards and honors ==
- 1978 International Gold Award
- 1980 Hermann Gutzmann medal
- 1982 the degree of Professor honoris causa
- 1997 Voice Foundation's Quintana Research Award
- 1997 G. Paul Moore Lecturer
- 2002 Doctor honoris causa by the University of Oulu, Finland

== Publications ==
=== Thesis ===
- Sonninen, Aatto: The role of the external laryngeal muscles in length-adjustment of the vocal cords in singing : phoniatric, roentgenologic and experimental studies of the mechanism of pitch change in the voice with special reference to the function of sternothyroid. OCLC 58105835. 102 pages. Acta oto-laryngologica. University of Helsinki, Finland, 1956. ISSN 0365-5237.

=== Journal articles ===
- Hurme, Pertti (toim.): Vox Humana. Juhlakirja Aatto Sonnisen 60-vuotispäiväksi 24.12.1982. OCLC 876166373. Studies Presented to Aatto Sonninen on the Occasion of His Sixtieth Birthday, 24 December 1982, Papers in Speech Research, 5, University of Jyväskylä, Finland. ISBN 978-951-6787131.
- Sonninen, Aatto & Hurme, Pertti & Toivonen, Raimo & Vilkman, Erkki: Computer Voice Fields of Connected Speech, Papers in Speech Research, University of Jyväskylä, Finland 6, pp. 93–111. 1985.
- Sonninen, Aatto & Hurme, Pertti & Toivonen, Raimo & Vilkman, Erkki: Computer Voice Fields of Connected Speech, Symposium on Voice Disorders, Sweden, 23 August 1985.
- Vilkman, Erkki & Sonninen, Aatto & Hurme, Pertti: Observations on Voice Production by Means of Computer Voice Fields. In: Logopedics and Phoniatrics. Issues for Future Research. Proceedings of the XXth Congress of the International Association Logopedics and Phoniatrics, pp. 370–371. Tokyo 1986. 3–7 August 1986.
- Sonninen, Aatto & Hurme, Pertti & Vilkman, Erkki: Observations of voice production by means of Computer Voice Fields. Folia Phoniatrica 1986;38:366.
- Jaroma, Marjatta & Sonninen, Aatto & Hurme, Pertti & Toivonen, Raimo: Computer Voice Field Observations of Menopausal Dysphonia. Paper presented at the 13th Congress of the European Union of Phoniatricians, pp. 34–35. Vienna 1986. 5–9 November 1986.
- Sonninen, Aatto & Vilkman, Erkki & Hurme, Pertti & Toivonen, Raimo: "Computer Voice Fields in Basic Phonation Research: Rotation vs. Gliding in Cricothyroid Articulation." (PDF). In Scandinavian Journal of Logopedics and Phoniatrics 12, pp. 20–28. 1987.
- Sonninen, Aatto & Hurme, Pertti & Pruszewicz, Antoni & Toivonen, Raimo: "Computer Voice Field Descriptions of Speech Audiometry Word Lists". In: Liber Amicorum: professori Dr. P. H. Damsté. On the Occasion of his Retirement by his Friends and Colleagues (L. van Gelder. C. Waar, H. van Wijngaarden, eds. ), Utcecht pp. 45–48. 1987.
- Sonninen, Aatto & Hurme, Pertti & Toivonen, Raimo: Computer Voice Fields in the Study of Normal Phonation. Acta phoniatrica Latina 10, pp. 345–356. 1988.
- Pruszewicz, Antoni; Sonninen, Aatto; Toivonen, Raimo; Hurme, Pertti (1988). "Komputerowe pole głosowe dla mowy w warunkach fizjologicznych i w niektorych stanach patologicznych" [Computer-assisted examination of the vocal field during speech in physiological and various pathological conditions]. Otolaryngol Pol (in Polish). 42 (3): 193–200. PMID 3226734.
- Sonninen, Aatto: "Ihmisäänen rekistereistä". (From the registers of human voice). Laulupedagogi 1989–1990. Laulupedagogit ry:n vuosijulkaisu. Helsinki: Yliopistopaino, Finland. pp. 4–21. 1990. ISSN 0784-5936.
