= Lombard effect =

Increased vocal effort in loud environments

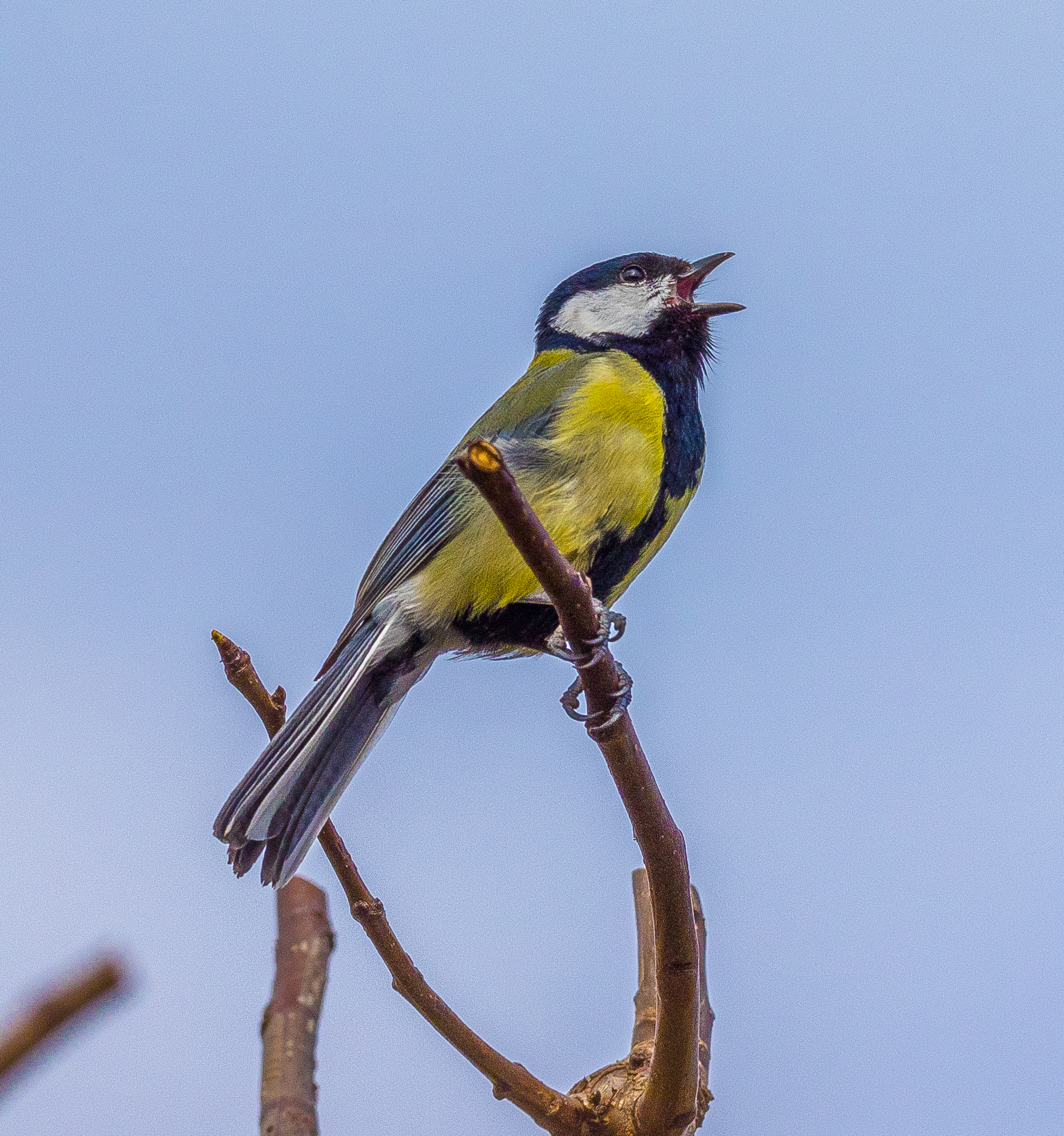
Great tits sing at a higher frequency in noise polluted urban surroundings than quieter ones to help overcome the auditory masking that would otherwise impair other birds hearing their song. Although great tits achieve a change in song frequency by switching song types, in other urban birds the change in frequency might be related to the Lombard effect. For instance, in humans, the Lombard effect results in speakers adjusting frequency

The Lombard effect or Lombard reflex is the involuntary tendency of speakers to increase their vocal effort when speaking in loud noise to enhance the audibility of their voice. This change includes not only loudness but also other acoustic features such as pitch, rate, and duration of syllables. This compensation effect maintains the auditory signal-to-noise ratio of the speaker's spoken words.

The effect links to the needs of effective communication, as there is a reduced effect when words are repeated or lists are read where communication intelligibility is not important. Since the effect is involuntary, it is used as a means to detect malingering in those simulating hearing loss. Research on birds and monkeys find that the effect also occurs in the vocalizations of animals.

The effect was discovered in 1909 by Étienne Lombard, a French otolaryngologist.

== Lombard speech ==
Listeners hear a speech recorded with background noise better than they hear a speech which has been recorded in silence with masking noise applied afterwards. This is because changes between normal and Lombard speech include:

- increase in phonetic fundamental frequencies
- shift in energy from low frequency bands to middle or high bands
- increase in sound intensity
- increase in vowel duration
- spectral tilting (or flattening): In normal speech, the spectral power at lower frequencies is much higher than the spectral power at higher frequencies. In Lombard speech, the spectral power at lower frequencies is not much higher than the spectral power at higher frequencies.
- shift in formant center frequencies for F1 (mainly) and F2
- the duration of content words are prolonged to a greater degree in noise than function words
- greater lung volumes are used,
- it is accompanied by larger facial movements, though these do not aid as much as sound changes

Though sometimes called the Lombard "reflex", it can be deliberately controlled in humans. These changes cannot be controlled by instructing a person to speak as they would in silence, though people can learn control with feedback.

The Lombard effect also occurs following laryngectomy when people following speech therapy talk with esophageal speech.

== Mechanisms ==
The intelligibility of an individual's own vocalization can be adjusted with audio-vocal reflexes using their own hearing (private loop), or it can be adjusted indirectly in terms of how well listeners can hear the vocalization (public loop). Both processes are involved in the Lombard effect.

=== Private loop ===
A speaker can regulate their vocalizations, particularly their amplitude relative to background noise, with reflexive auditory feedback. Such auditory feedback is known to maintain the production of vocalization since deafness affects the vocal acoustics of both humans and songbirds Changing the auditory feedback also changes vocalization in human speech or bird song. Neural circuits have been found in the brainstem that enable such reflex adjustment.

=== Public loop ===
A speaker can regulate their vocalizations at higher cognitive level in terms of observing its consequences on their audience's ability to hear it. This auditory self-monitoring adjusts vocalizations in terms of learnt associations of what features of their vocalization, when made in noise, create effective and efficient communication. The Lombard effect has been found to be greatest upon those words that are important to the listener to understand a speaker suggesting such cognitive effects are important.

=== Development ===
Both private and public loop processes exist in children. There is a development shift however from the Lombard effect being linked to acoustic self-monitoring in young children to the adjustment of vocalizations to aid its intelligibility for others in adults.

=== Neurology ===
The Lombard effect depends upon audio-vocal neurons in the periolivary region of the superior olivary complex and the adjacent pontine reticular formation. It has been suggested that the Lombard effect might also involve the higher cortical areas that control these lower brainstem areas.

== Choral singing ==
Choral singers experience reduced feedback due to the sound of other singers upon their own voice. This results in a tendency for people in choruses to sing at a louder level if it is not controlled by a conductor. Trained singers can resist this effect but it has been suggested that after a concert they might speak more loudly in noisy surroundings, such as after-concert parties.

The Lombard effect also occurs to those playing instruments such as the guitar.

== Animal vocalization ==
Noise has been found to affect the vocalizations of animals that vocalize against a background of human noise pollution. Outside of humans, it was first demonstrated in 1972 on Japanese quails. Some of the animals for which the Lombard effect has also been found in the vocalization are:

- Bats
  - Pale spear-nosed bats
- Beluga whales
- Budgerigars
- Canaries
- Cats
- Chickens
- Common marmosets
- Cottontop tamarins
- Japanese quail
- Nightingales
- Rhesus macaques
- Squirrel monkey
- Túngara frogs
- Zebra finches

One study suggests that exposure to white noise increases call frequency and intensity while decreasing call duration in rats. The primary auditory cortex appears to be involved in mediating the changes observed in call duration.

Some frogs can vary their call amplitude, but do not use this capacity for communication in noise. For example, in the presence of noise, Cope's gray treefrogs raise call duration and rate, but not amplitude.

When echolocating in broadband noise, Tadarida brasiliensis increase their call amplitude, duration and bandwidth simultaneously. This is similar for human speech, monkey calls and bird vocalizations.

== See also ==
- Acoustic ecology
- Bird vocalization
- Human voice
- Intelligibility (communication)
- Noise health effects
- Noise pollution
- Occlusion effect
- Whale song
