= Mohammed Helmy =

Egyptian doctor and Righteous Among the Nations recipient

- محمد حلمي
- Born: 25 July 1901; Khartoum, Anglo-Egyptian Sudan (now Sudan)
- Died: 10 January 1982 (aged 80); West Berlin, West Germany (now Berlin, Germany)
- Occupation: Physician
- Employer: Robert Koch Institute
- Known for: Saving Jews from the Holocaust during World War II alongside Frieda Szturmann
- Spouse: Emmi Ernst (c. 1943)
- Awards: Righteous Among the Nations (2013)

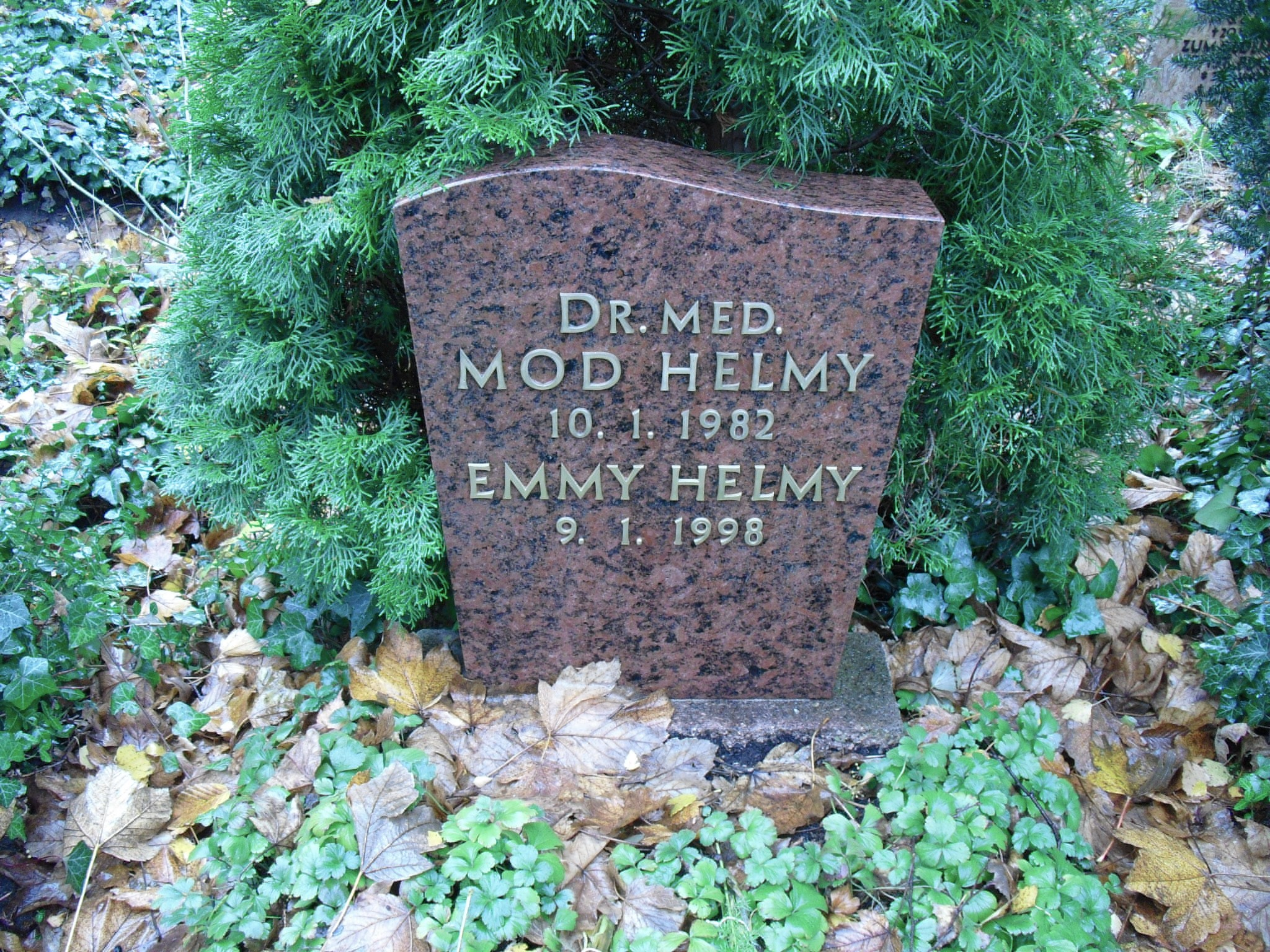
Grave of Egyptian physician Mod Helmy in Friedhof Heerstraße in Berlin-Westend

Mohammed ″Mod″ Helmy (Arabic: محمد حلمي; 25 July 1901 – 10 January 1982) was an Egyptian-German physician who was recognized by Israel as one of the Righteous Among the Nations in 2013, with his name being listed at Yad Vashem in the city of Jerusalem. Born in Sudan, he moved to Berlin to study medicine and was later involved in saving many Jews from being exterminated by Nazi Germany during the Holocaust. After World War II he was finally allowed to marry his love Emmi. In 2013 Helmy was the first Arab to be recognized as a Righteous Among the Nations; his nephews were summoned by Yad Vashem to receive the honour on his behalf, but were reluctant to do so because of the Arab–Israeli conflict, though they eventually attended the ceremony at the German foreign ministry.

== Early life and education ==
Mod Helmy was born in 1901 in Khartoum, in Anglo-Egyptian Sudan, into an influential family as the child of an Egyptian Army major, and a Sudanese mother. He was educated in Cairo and went to Berlin in 1922 to study medicine. The 'Arabic Berlin' of the Weimar period centred around the grand mosque in the Wilmersdorf district with its neo-moorish dome a landmark of the capital. Its community was open, progressive, and welcomed Jewish luminaries, including Albert Einstein and philosopher Martin Buber, to cultural events. The mosque’s manager, Dr. Hugo ″Hamid″ Marcus, continued to identify as a member of Berlin's Jewish community after having converted to Islam, he was so enthusiastic about Islam that he was one of the first to begin translating the Quran. Mod Helmy completed his state examinations in 1929, and began his doctorate at the Robert Koch Hospital (later called Krankenhaus Moabit) in 1931. He became Head of the Urology at the Robert Koch Hospital after having been apprenticed by professor Georg Klemperer, a renowned internist who was Jewish, like 70% of the doctors at the Robert Koch Hospital at that time – he was the brother of Victor Klemperer, the forensic diarist of daily life under the terror of the ″Third Reich″.

== Nazi takeover of Germany ==
Adolf Hitler's rise to power in 1933 upended life in Germany, by that time most Arabs had left the country, fearing their racist ideology. Helmy was one of just 300 who decided to stay, bound to both his patients and to his true love he had met, the Berlin-born Emmi Ernst. Extensively involved in Nazi policies, the hospital issued a wave of dismissals three months after the Nazis came to power, and would lose almost all its mid-level scientists. Helmy himself was racialized as a “Hamite” after Ham from Old Testament. Those classified as Hamitic were considered of ″non-Aryan race″ and subject to harassment and persecution, according to Nazi racial theories. Helmy was fired from his hospital in 1937 and barred from practicing medicine under the new Nazi laws. Since he could no longer obtain a medical license, Helmy opened a private practice without licensure and treated patients privately. He was also forbidden from marrying his fiancée, Emmi Ernst.

Helmy witnessed the escalating humiliations and persecution Jewish people, on November 9–10, 1938, known euphemistic as Kristallnacht, the Nazis would torch hundreds of synagogues across Germany, Austria, and the Sudetenland and trash and loot 7,500 Jewish-owned businesses and murdered hundreds of Jews. Helmy witnessed how, Anna Boros, a Jewish teenager whose life he would go on to save, being forced to transfer to a ″Jewish only school″. Like her family, she had been one of his patients since 1936, the Boros family considered themselves lucky that Dr Helmy treated them since Jewish people were forbidden to see a German “Aryan” doctor. Following the closure of the Jewish school in 1940, Helmy began by degrees to take care of Anna.

At the same time, Helmy had to be increasingly cautious himself. On September 5, 1939, immediately following the start of World War II, the Ordinance on the Treatment of Foreigners required citizens of "enemy states" to register with authorities. Shortly after, Arabs in Germany and territories annexed or occupied by the Nazis were arrested, jailed, and deported to the Wülzburg internment camp near Nüremberg. Egyptian detainees in the camp were to be exchanged for Germans detained in Egypt. On 3 October 1939, Helmy was arrested and detained for a month before being sent to Wülzburg, where he fell seriously ill. He was released alongside the rest of the Egyptian prisoners in December. In January 1940, Reichsführer-SS Heinrich Himmler ordered the internment of all adult male Egyptian nationals, which led to an ill Helmy being arrested for a second time. The Egyptian embassy managed to secure Helmy's early release in 1940 due to his deteriorating condition, sparing him another year in the internment camp.

When the Nazis began deporting Jews from Berlin in 1942, the 17-year-old Anna Boros asked Helmy for help. The Gestapo had previously demanded her to leave Germany within three days and go back to Romania. The Romanian consulate in Berlin warned them about the deadly journey. Helmy hid her in his girlfriend Emmy's garden shed in the suburb of Buch. When this became too risky, he took Anna to stay at acquaintances’ homes. He created the story that Anna had escaped to Romania, while giving her an identity as his headscarfed Muslim niece, ″Nadya″. Helmy took her on as his assistant at his GP practice and taught her how to conduct blood tests and use the microscope. He managed to evade Gestapo interrogations, despite the authorities being well aware Helmy treated Jews. He also hid a number of Anna's relatives from Nazi persecution with the help of Frieda Szturmann, a friend of his. For over a year, Szturmann hid and protected Anna's 67-year-old grandmother and shared her food rations with her. Helmy also provided for them and attended to their medical needs.

For over a year, Helmy was obliged to report to the police twice every day and provide proof every month that he was too ill to be present to the internment camp. Conscripted to the practice of Dr. Johannes Wedekind in Charlottenburg, Helmy fabricated sick notes for foreign workers to help them return to their countries, and also for German citizens to help them avoid labor civil conscription, and obligatory military service.

In 1943, Helmy and his Muslim assistant ″Nadya″ was summoned to the Prinz-Albrecht-Palais, the notorious Berlin headquarters of the SS. He was tasked with providing Muslim guests, including the Grand Mufti of Jerusalem Amin al-Husseini, with medical care. Some members of the Muslim community began to assist the Nazis, helping promote the regime’s antisemitic propaganda and translating Mein Kampf into Arabic. Others – such as Mod Helmy – saw in the Mufti’s relationship with the Nazis an opportunity to take on a role in resisting the persecution of Jews.

Anna Boros and four of her relatives were able to evade deportation thanks to Helmy and Szturmann. They would go on to emigrate to the United States. Mod Helmy and Anna Boros (later Gutman) remained close friends throughout their lives.

After the war Helmy was finally able to marry his fiancée Emmi and became director of the hospital in Buch. In 1962 he was recognized as a hero by the Berlin Senate. That same year his friend Frieda Szturmann died.

He died in 1982.

== Tributes ==
=== Discovery of Helmy's correspondence ===
When letters sent by Anna Boros (later Gutman) and her relatives shortly after the war on behalf of Helmy and Szturmann to the Berlin Senate were discovered in the Berlin archives in the 2010s, they were submitted to Yad Vashem's Righteous Among the Nations Department. On 18 March 2013, the Commission for the Designation of the Righteous decided to award Helmy and Szturmann the title of Righteous Among the Nations.

=== Ceremony by Yad Vashem ===
In the fall of 2010 a medal engraved with a Jewish proverb taken from the Talmud, a similar version of which can also be found in the Quran: "Whosoever saves a single life saves an entire universe" and accompanying certificate of honor intended for Mod Helmy. But his relatives in Cairo were hesitant to accept it, citing hostile relations between Israel and Egypt. "We would be delighted if another country honored him,” they explained to German Jewish Ronen Steinke who visited them. “Helmy helped all people no matter what their religion. Now Israel wants to honor him specifically because he helped Jews. But this doesn't do justice to what he did."

Eventually, four years after Mohammed Helmy's family accepted the award Righteous Among the Nations, his nephew Prof. Nasser Kotby agreed to receive the certificate from the Israeli ambassador to Berlin, but at a ceremony in the German Foreign Ministry, not in the Israeli Embassy, due to the family's difficulty in receiving the honor directly from an Israeli institution. The ceremony took place on 26 October 2017 with also present descendants of the Jewish family from New York.

=== In films and other media ===
The film Mohamed and Anna – In Plain Sight by Israeli filmmaker Taliya Finkel was released in Israeli TV. Finkel had located and made contact with Helmy's nephew Dr. Nasser Kotby, who agreed to participate the film and to be the first Arab to ever talk about the holocaust in a film. Finkel proposed Dr. Kotby to accept the Yad Vashem award in Berlin and Kotby agreed.

On 25 July 2023, Helmy's 122nd birthday was celebrated through a Google Doodle.

== Literature ==
- Ronen Steinke: Anna and Dr Helmy: How an Arab doctor saved a Jewish girl in Hitler's Berlin, Oxford University Press 2021
- Igal Avidan, Helmut Kuhn: Mod Helmy. Wie ein arabischer Arzt in Berlin Juden vor der Gestapo rettete. Munich: Dtv Verlagsgesellschaft, 2017, ISBN 978-3-423-28146-1.
