= Ronen Steinke =

German political journalist and author

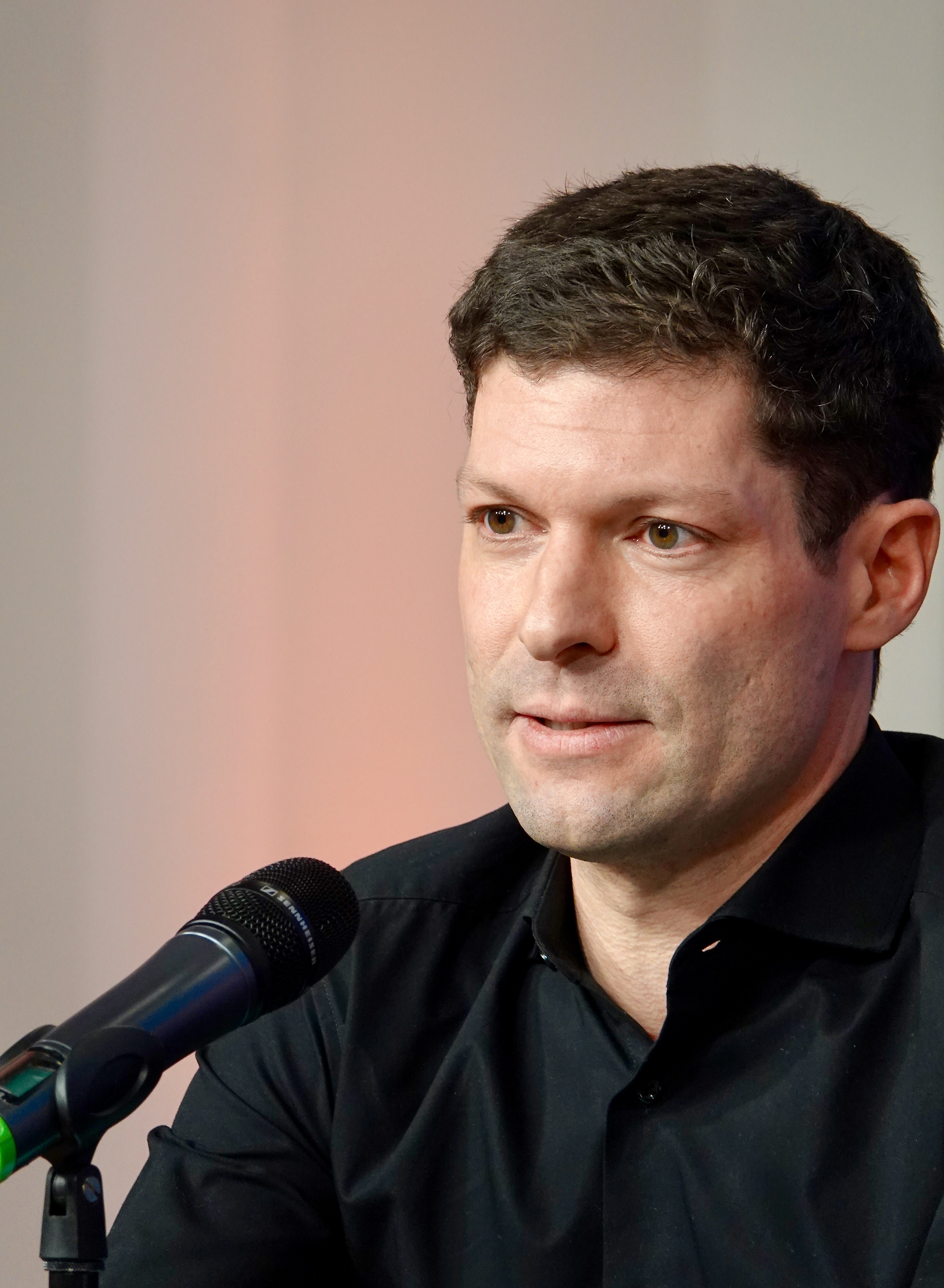
Steinke 2023

Ronen Steinke (born 1983) is a German political journalist and author whose essays and books on issues of law and society have been discussed in The Times, The Guardian, Haaretz, De Volkskrant, Le Figaro, The Asahi Shimbun and The New York Review of Books. In 2013, Steinke published the biography of the German-Jewish prosecutor Fritz Bauer, who secretly worked with the Mossad and brought Nazi war criminals to justice in the 1960s. The book, which received a preface by Andreas Voßkuhle, the then president of the German supreme court, inspired the award-winning 2015 film The People vs. Fritz Bauer.

== Education ==
Steinke was educated at Bucerius Law School, Hamburg, and Temple University, Japan Campus, Tokyo, and holds a doctorate in international criminal law, praised as a "masterpiece" by the European Journal of International Law. From 2012 to 2013 he was a visiting scholar at Frankfurt University's Institute for Holocaust Research.

== Career ==
As legal affairs editor with Germany's leading broadsheet, Süddeutsche Zeitung, he since frequently writes columns and essays on German politics and society. Along with a group of lawyers and scholars, Steinke edits an annual report on right-wing extremism in Germany. Legal Tribune Online referred to him as "currently the most important and most productive legal journalist in Germany."

After the Halle synagogue shooting in 2019, Steinke, who is himself a German Jew, published a critique of what he claims is the failure of the German state to address violent antisemitism. This was named one of the top 3 non-fiction books by Die Zeit.

"Ronen Steinke (…) studied the issue in depth after the Halle attack, and found that too often Jews are left to avert the danger of possible assaults themselves. In his book "Terror Against Jews," published earlier this year after he visited more than 20 Jewish communities around the country, Steinke found that while authorities are helpful with making security assessments, the communities themselves are often left to implement the official suggestions." – Times of Israel

Asked whether Jews should consider emigrating to Israel, Steinke said in an interview with public broadcaster Bayerischer Rundfunk:

"I am in favour of people leaving Germany due to rising antisemitism. But it should be the antisemites who leave. I hear there's room on the North Pole."

This was followed by a book-length essay by Steinke in 2020 on antisemitic tropes in the present-day German language.

Steinke's account of the story of Mohammed Helmy, the first Arab to be honoured as Righteous Among the Nations by Yad Vashem, was translated into seven languages and named book of the week by the Observer in 2021.

His most recent work, an exploration of social injustices in the German prison system, which Steinke published in 2022, rekindled a wider debate on the need for criminal justice reform in Germany. Reacting in July 2022, the Minister of Justice, Marco Buschmann, announced he would soften the rules on imprisonment for failure to pay a fine. Calls for more radical reform persist, though. Steinke advocates to stop imprisoning offenders who are unable to pay a fine through no fault of their own, as in Sweden, and to make the right of an accused to a public defender unconditional, as in the US.

== Other activities ==
- Max Planck Institute for the Study of Crime, Security and Law, Member of the Board of Trustees

== Books ==
- The Politics of International Criminal Justice. Hart Publishers, Oxford 2012
- Fritz Bauer: The Jewish Prosecutor Who Brought Eichmann and Auschwitz to Trial. Trans. Sinéad Crowe, Indiana University Press 2020. (Original: Fritz Bauer. Oder Auschwitz vor Gericht, Piper, Munich 2013)
- Anna and Dr. Helmy. How an Egyptian Doctor saved a Jewish Girl in Hitler's Berlin, Trans. Sharon Howe, Oxford University Press, 2021 (Original: Der Muslim und die Jüdin, Berlin 2017)
- Terror gegen Juden. Wie antisemitische Gewalt erstarkt und der Staat versagt, Berlin Verlag, Berlin, 2020.
- Antisemitismus in der Sprache, Duden Verlag, Berlin 2020.
- Vor dem Gesetz sind nicht alle gleich. Die neue Klassenjustiz, Berlin Verlag, Berlin, 2022.
