= Nasser Muhammad =

Nasser Muhammad (Arabic: ناصر محمد), and other variants using the Arabic definite article "Al-" (Arabic: ال) such as Nasser Al-Muhammad (Arabic: ناصر المحمد), may refer to:

- Al-Nasir Muhammad (1285–1341), Bahri Mamluk Sultan of Egypt
- An-Nasir Muhammad ibn Qaitbay (1482–1498), Mamluk Sultan of Egypt
- Nasser Mohammadkhani (born 1957), Iranian footballer
- Nasser Al-Mohammed Al-Sabah (born 1940), 6th Prime Minister of the State of Kuwait
- An-Nasir ad-Din Muhammad (1411–1422), Mamluk Sultan of Egypt
- Ali Nasir Muhammad (born 1939), leader of South Yemen (1980–1986)
- Al-Mansur Nasir al-Din Muhammad (r. 1198–1200), Ayyubid Sultan of Egypt

== See also ==
- Muhammad Nasser (disambiguation)
- Nasser (name)
- Muhammad (name)
