= NTi Audio =

Liechtenstein audio equipment manufacturer

Coordinates: 47°10′28″N 9°30′49″E

NTi Audio AG
- Industry: Manufacturing
- Predecessor: NTI AG, Neutrik Test Instruments AG, Neutrik
- Founded: 2000
- Headquarters: Schaan, Liechtenstein
- Area served: Worldwide
- Key people: Hansjörg Prettner (CEO)
- Products: Audio and Acoustic Test Instruments, Microphones
- Website: www.nti-audio.com

NTi Audio AG is a manufacturer of test and measurement instruments for acoustics, audio and vibration applications. With headquarters in Schaan, Liechtenstein, the company specializes in end-of-line audio testing for manufacturing quality control purposes, provides instruments for testing public address systems in safety-critical environments and also produces handheld Audio Analyzers and generators aimed at the professional audio industry.

NTi Audio is a member of the Liechtenstein Chamber of Commerce, the Audio Engineering Society AES, the International Institute of Noise Control Engineering (I-INCE), the Association of Loudspeaker Manufacturing & Acoustics International ALMA, the Swiss Society of Acoustics SGA as well as the Association for Electrical Engineering, Power and Information Technologies SEV.

== Company history ==
The company was formed in March 2000 through a management buyout of the Audio Measurement Division of Neutrik AG. After nine years of operation NTI AG changed its name to NTi Audio AG (New Technologies in Audio).

The first product was introduced in 1977 with the test & measurement department of Neutrik developing the AudioTracer frequency response chart recorder, followed in 1983 by the modular AudioGraph series. The stand-alone A1 and A2 Analyzers series were added in 1991 and 1994 respectively. With the Rapid-Test family a series of multi-tone Analyzers was introduced in 1996 providing fast production tests for the mobile phone industry. They are equipped with IEEE488.2 GPIB interfaces with all control software developed under National Instruments LabWindows CVI.

1999 saw the introduction of the handheld Signal generator Minirator MR-1. The ML1 handheld audio analyzer, AL1 sound level meter and acoustic analyzer and DL1 digital audio analyzer instruments were then added to the product range. These tools are used by audio professionals and for educational purposes.

Other products include the PureSound software extension, for use with the Rapid-Test RT-2M dual channel, multi-tone Audio Frequency Analyzer, to provide test results for loudspeaker testing. The EXEL series handheld devices were introduced between 2006 and 2010. These were the XL2 Sound Level Meter (also known as Audio and Acoustic Analyzer), the Minirator MR2 and MR-PRO audio generators, the Digirator DR2 digital audio signal generator and the TalkBox acoustic generator used as a STIPA reference.

In 2011 the FLEXUS FX100 Audio Analyzer was introduced for audio testing in research, design laboratories, service and production environment. In 2022 they released a networked class 1 sound level meter, the XL3 Sound Level Meter.

== The company today ==
NTi Audio develops and markets all products from the Schaan headquarters. Manufacturing of electronic PCBs is outsourced to Swiss manufacturers. NTi has subsidiaries in Portland (US), Suzhou (China), Tokyo (Japan), Seoul (Korea), Prague (Czech), London (UK), Limonest (France) and Essen (Germany) and sales partners in more than 50 countries worldwide.

== See also ==
- List of microphone manufacturers
