= Ingo Titze =

Voice scientist

Ingo R. Titze is a voice scientist and executive director of the National Center for Voice and Speech and Adjunct Professor in the Department of Otolaryngology/Head and Neck Surgery at the University of Utah in Salt Lake City. He also teaches at the Summer Vocology Institute, also housed at the University of Utah. He is a Distinguished Professor at the Department of Communication Sciences and Disorders at the University of Iowa and has written several books relating to the human voice.

== Education ==
Titze received a B.S. in electrical engineering from the University of Utah, and then an M.S.E.E. in electrical engineering, with a minor in physics from the University of Utah. He graduated with a Ph.D. in physics from Brigham Young University in 1972. In 1976 he went to Gallaudet University, where he received his first of many grants from the National Institutes of Health.

== Career ==
Prior to his conjoint positions at the Universities of Utah and Iowa (for which he began in 2009 and 1990, respectively) he was the Chief Scientist and Executive Director for the National Center for Voice and Speech from 1994–2009, which was then housed at the Denver Center for the Performing Arts.

From 1983–1994 he served as the Director of Research for the Recording and Research Center, also housed at the Denver Center for the Performing Arts, and from 1989–1994 he was adjunct professor in the Westminster Choir College at Princeton, New Jersey.

Titze was a consultant to the Department of Linguistics/Speech Analysis at Bell Laboratories, Murray Hill, a visiting Lecturer at the Department of Hearing/Speech Science at the University of Maryland, and an associate professor for the Department of Speech Pathology and Audiology for the University of Iowa from 1979–1995.

His early career positions included associate professor in the Department of Physics at the King Fahd University of Petroleum and Minerals, Dhahran, Saudi Arabia, assistant professor for the Sensory Communication Research Laboratory at Gallaudet College from 1976–1979, lecturer in physics and electrical engineering at California State Polytechnic University, physics instructor at Pomona College from 1973–1974, and Brigham Young University from 1972–1973.

Before accepting a position to work as a research engineer at the Boeing Company of Seattle from 1968–1969, he worked at the National Reactor Test Station (1965–1966) and as a research engineer at North American Aviation in Tulsa, Oklahoma,

Titze began his career as a summer research engineer for Argonne National Laboratory in Arco, Idaho in 1963.

== Vocology ==
Between the years of 1979–1981, Titze developed a new course entitled Principles of Voice Production, which was taught jointly in the School of Music. During the 1980s he developed various university courses that included acoustics, biomechanics of speech, experimental phonetics, digital signal processing, voice therapy and vocal pedagogy, all of which culminated in him coining the phrase 'vocology', which he then proposed as a discipline parallel to audiology.

== Research ==
Titze has been awarded multiple grants during his career from the National Institutes of Health, to study voice health and voice disorders. His research on the voice is prolific, with over 160 research articles listed at the NIH, alone.

== Media ==
- 2015 Appeared in BBC Radio 3, BBC Proms, "Singing Machines"
- 2013 Appeared in Reuters, BBC, Pacific Standard, Iowa Now, and AIP regarding his “Voice Vote” article
- 1992 Featured on Television Documentary, NDR, Hamburg, Germany
- 1986 Part of a documentary on Quantum, The Science Series, Australian Broadcasting Corporation, produced and directed by Peter Hiscock
- 1985 Part of a nationally aired feature on Voice Research, Cable News Network (CNN), Science and Technology Today series, produced by Charles Crawford
- 1985 Part of a documentary entitled "Figures of Speech" on the series Innovation, WNET (Public Television Network), produced by Duncan Scott

== Awards ==
- 2012: Kay-Pentax Lecturer and Awards, American Speech Language Hearing Association
- 2010: Honors of the Association, American Speech-Language-Hearing Association
- 2009: Science Writing Award for Professional in Acoustics, The Acoustical Society of America
- 2007: Silver Medal, the Acoustical Society of America
- 2004: Wullstein Lecture and Award, German Ear, Nose, Throat Association
- 2003: Karl Storz Lecture Award, American Society of Pediatric Otolaryngology
- 2002: Willard R. Zemlin Lecture Award, American Speech–Language–Hearing Association
- 1996: American Laryngological Association Award
- 1996: Honored Alumnus, College of Physical & Mathematical Sciences, Brigham Young Univ.
- 1995: University of Iowa Regents Award
- 1992: Fellow, American Speech Language Hearing Association
- 1992: Editor's Award Speech Science, American Speech Language Hearing Association
- 1990: Quintana Award, The Voice Foundation
- 1989: Claude Pepper Award, National Institutes of Health
- 1986: Part of a documentary on Quantum, a science series of the Australian Broadcasting Corporation
- 1984: William and Harriott Gould Award for laryngeal physiology
- 1984: Jacob Javits Neurosciences Investigation Award
- 1983: Fellow, Acoustical Society of America
- 1969: NDEA Graduate Fellow
- 1959: Josephine Bean Scholarship

== Bibliography ==
=== Books ===
- Fascinations with the Human Voice. National Center for Voice and Speech. Translated into German, Japanese, Finnish, Spanish, Chinese, Italian, French. Titze, I.R. (2010).
- Vocology: The Science and Practice of Voice Habilitation. National Center for Voice and Speech, Salt Lake City, UT. Titze, I.R., & Verdolini, K. (2012).
- The Myoelastic-Aerodynamic Theory of Phonation. Denver, CO 80204: National Center for Voice and Speech (2006). Titze, I.R.
- Principles of Voice Production. Englewood Cliffs, NJ: Prentice Hall (1994). Reprinted by the National Center for Voice and Speech, Denver, CO 80204 (2000). Translated into Chinese, German, Japanese and Portuguese. Titze, I.R.
- Vocal Fold Physiology: Frontiers in Basic Science. San Diego: Singular Publishing Group (1992). Titze, I.R. (Ed.).
- Vocal Health and Science. Jacksonville, FL: The National Association of Teachers of Singing (1991). Sataloff, R.T. & Titze, I.R. (Eds.).
- Vocal Fold Physiology: Biomechanics, Acoustics, and Phonatory Control. Denver CO: Denver Center for the Performing Arts (1985). Titze, I.R. & Scherer, R.C. (Eds.).

== See also ==
- Phonation
- Place of articulation
- Vocal folds
- Vocology
