= Mohammed Nasser Al Ahbabi =

UAE engineer and space administrator

Mohammed Nasser Al Ahbabi is the Director General of United Arab Emirates Space Agency. Before joining the UAE Space Agency, Ahbabi was part of a UAE Armed Forces think tank project, where he worked alongside military and government stakeholders, on concepts and technologies in Smart Defense and Cyber Warfare, amongst others. He has an active role in ITU-R and has served as the head of YAHSAT MilSatCom Project.

== Education ==
In 1998, Mohammed Nasser Al Ahbabi obtained a degree in electronic engineering from the University of California, United States of America. He obtained a masters degree in communications from the University of Southampton, United Kingdom in 2001, and a Ph.D in Laser and Fibre Optics from the same university in 2005.

== Career ==
Mohammed Nasser Al Ahbabi initially served as a telecommunications officer for the UAE Armed Forces. Concurrently, he worked as a coordinator for Dubai Internet City. From 2005 to 2012, he was a telecommunications officer at Sharyan Al Doea Network, and a project manager in the military division at Al Yah Satellite Communications. He is a part of the Hope Mars Mission team, which plans to send the Hope Space exploration probe into Mars' orbit by 2020.

== Recognition ==
Mohammed Nasser Al Ahbabi has been ranked 43 in the Top 100 Most Powerful Arabs 2018 list compiled by Gulf Business. He was ranked 13 in Richtopia's list of the world’s 100 most influential figures in the space exploration sector.
