= Nafih Mohammed Naser =

Indian education activist

- Born: Bengaluru, Karnataka
- Known for: Activism for children's rights and children's education

Nafih Mohammed Naser is an Indian education activist who advocates and campaigns for the effective use of the right to education in India.

== Work ==
Nafih and his team have been teaching thousands of students in south India and helping the children access quality education under the Right to Education Act, 2009. He is also known for his notable work in putting an end to child labour with the help of civil society groups, government organizations, Indian faith leaders, Indian political leaders, local, state and national bodies of the Indian government, members of the Indian judiciary and educational institutions across India.
