= Vocology =

Science and practice of vocal habilitation

- Field: Speech and language pathology, Laryngology, Voice therapy
- Significant topics: Voice habilitation, vocal training, voice therapy
- Established: 1996
- Founders: Ingo Titze, George Gates
- Related fields: Speech-language pathology, Otolaryngology, Phoniatrics, Voice pedagogy
- Professional associations: Pan-American Vocology Association
- Academic journal: Logopedics, Phoniatrics, Vocology
- Notable institutions: National Center for Voice and Speech at University of Utah; Mount Sinai Medical Center; Indiana University Bloomington

Vocology is the science and practice of vocal habilitation, or vocal training and therapy. Its concerns include the nature of speech and language pathology, the defects of the vocal tract (laryngology), the remediation of speech therapy, and the voice training (voice therapy) and voice pedagogy of song and speech for actors and public speakers.

In its broadest sense, vocology is the study of voice, but as a professional discipline it has a narrower focus: the science and practice of voice habilitation, which includes evaluation, diagnosis, and intervention.

== History ==
Vocology was invented (simultaneously, but independently) by Ingo Titze, and an otolaryngologist at Washington University in St. Louis, Prof. George Gates. Titze defines vocology as "the science and practice of voice habilitation, with a strong emphasis on habilitation". To habilitate means to “enable”, to “equip for”, to “capacitate”; in other words, to assist in performing whatever function that needs to be performed". He goes on that this "is more than repairing a voice or bringing it back to a former state ... rather, it is the process of strengthening and equipping the voice to meet very specific and special demands".

== Requirements and educational programs ==
It is not yet its own professional degree, thus it only assists the voice medicine team. Usually a person practicing vocology is a voice coach with additional training in the voice medical arts, a prepared voice/singing teacher, or a speech pathologist with additional voice performance training—so they can better treat the professional voice user. The study of vocology is recognized academically by courses and institutes in several countries Chile, Colombia, India, Italy, France, Canada, Belgium, United States, Lebanon and Korea.

== External links for programs in different countries ==
=== Belgium ===
- Vocologie

=== Chile ===
- Diplomado en Vocologia, Universidad de los Andes

=== Colombia ===
- Vocology Center, Todo Comunica

=== France ===
- Ms Maya Hallay-Dufour is the first installed vocologist since 2017 and founded Larylab Voice & Speech Training center dedicated to vocology practice
- Reflecting the increased recognition of vocology, the Scandinavian Journal of Logopedics & Phoniatrics and Voice merged in 1996 with the new name Logopedics, Phoniatrics, Vocology.
- A new association bearing the name of vocology (Pan-American Vocology Association) has also been started.

=== India ===
- Chetana National Institute of Vocology

=== Italy ===
- Milan's Azienda Ospedaliera Fatebenefratelli e Oftalmico, University Alma Mater Studiorum in Bologna

=== Korea, Republic of ===
- Korean Vocology Association

=== United States ===
- Grabscheid Voice Center at Mount Sinai Medical Center
- Indiana University Bloomington
- Lamar University
- New York University
- National Center for Voice and Speech at the University of Utah offer an 8-week intensive course (9 graduate level university credits) and a Certificate in Vocology.
- Regional Center for Voice and Swallowing
- The Boston Conservatory at Berklee
- Rider University
- Vox Humana Laboratory at St. Luke's-Roosevelt Hospital Center
- University of Illinois at Urbana-Champaign
- University of Kansas
- University of Southern California Thornton School of Music
- Westminster Choir College

== See also ==
- Human Voice
- Speech
- Vocal loading
- Vocal fry
- Vocal rest
- Vocal range
- Vocal warm up
- Voice analysis
- Voice disorders
- Voice frequency
- Voice organ
- Voice pedagogy
- Voice projection
- Voice synthesis
