= National Center for Voice and Speech =

Multi-site research and teaching organization

The National Center for Voice and Speech (NCVS), is a multi-site research and teaching organization dedicated to studying the characteristics, limitations and enhancement of human voice and speech. The NCVS is located in Salt Lake City, Utah with the Lead Institution located at the University of Utah. NCVS is also a Center at the University of Iowa where it has laboratories in the Department of Speech Pathology and Audiology. In addition, the NCVS has collaborators in Denver and at many institutions around the United States. Its focus is vocology, or the science and practice of voice habilitation.

== History ==
Initially conceived as a "center without walls," the NCVS was formally organized in 1990 with the assistance of a grant from the National Institute on Deafness and Other Communication Disorders (NIDCD), an institute of the National Institutes of Health (NIH). The NCVS was organized on the premise that a consortium of institutions (including the Wilber James Gould Voice Center at the DCPA, University of Iowa, University of Utah, University of Wisconsin–Madison) would be better able to conduct and disseminate research than a single organization. NCVS members, although geographically separate, were linked by a common desire to fully understand the characteristics, limitations and enhancement of human voice and speech.

In 1999, NIDCD discontinued the Multi-Purpose Research and Training Center funding mechanism for the entire institute focusing instead on single-project research awards (R01s). In a July 2000 meeting, however, NCVS investigators voted unanimously to continue the concept of a national resource center for voice and speech, to be driven by a variety of single-project research awards (R01s), as well as health communication, core, and training grants. In 2001, the NCVS moved its central location to Denver, where the otolaryngologist Dr. Wilbur James Gould had founded a center to study the voice and speech patterns of stage performers.

The NCVS team of investigators, led by Ingo Titze, studies the powers, limitations and enhancement of human voice and speech. The investigators are scientists, clinicians, educators, engineers and musicians who use diverse backgrounds (i.e., speech-language pathology, physics, computer science, acoustics, vocal performance, biology, medicine and engineering) to work together on voice and speech investigations. As a direct outgrowth of their work, NCVS members also teach other investigators and practitioners who work with voice, as well as speech clients and the general public. One example is the Summer Vocology Institute, which trains voice coaches and vocal health professionals in the study of Vocology.

== Current Research and Some of Related Published Papers ==
1. Occupational Safety in Vocalization
2. Biomechanical Modeling
3. Simulation of Vocal Production for Research and Therapeutic Interventions
4. Computer Simulation of Phonosurgical Procedures
5. Voice Treatment for Adults Suffering from Parkinson's Disease (including the Lee Silverman Voice Treatment, LSVT)
6. Voice Treatment for Children with Down Syndrome (including LSVT)
7. Voice Forensics & Speaker Identification
8. Laryngeal Tissue Engineering
9. Voice Academy (an online tool for teachers)

== See also ==
- Vocology
- Phonation
- Human Voice
