= Vocal effort =

Parameter of the voice

Vocal effort is a quantity varied by speakers when adjusting to an increase or decrease in the communication distance. The communication distance is the distance between the speaker and the listener. Vocal effort is a subjective physiological quantity, and is mainly dependent on subglottal pressure, vocal fold tension, and jaw opening. Vocal effort is different from sound pressure. To measure vocal effort, listeners are asked to rate the distance between the speaker and the addressee.

Repeated vocal effort can lead to chronic vocal pathologies. Several professional occupations requiring heavy vocal use, such as sport and fitness instructors, have been associated with an increase in developing vocal pathologies
