= Vocal loading =

Vocal loading is the stress inflicted on the speech organs when speaking for long periods.

== Background ==
Of the working population, about 13% have professions where their voice is their primary tool. That includes professions such as teachers, sales personnel, actors and singers, and TV and radio reporters. Many of them, especially teachers, suffer from voice-related medical problems. In a larger scope, this involves millions of sick-leave days every year, for example, both in the US and the European Union. Still, research in vocal loading has often been treated as a minor subject.

== Voice organ ==
Voiced speech is produced by air streaming from the lungs through the vocal cords, setting them into an oscillating movement. In every oscillation, the vocal folds are closed for a short period of time. When the folds reopen the pressure under the folds is released. These changes in pressure form the waves called (voiced) speech.

== Loading on tissue in vocal folds ==
The fundamental frequency of speech for an average male is around 110 Hz and for an average female around 220 Hz. That means that for voiced sounds the vocal folds will hit together 110 or 220 times a second, respectively. Suppose then that a female is speaking continuously for an hour. Of this time perhaps five minutes is voiced speech. The folds will then hit together more than 30 thousand times an hour. It is intuitively clear that the vocal fold tissue will experience some tiring due to this large number of hits.

Vocal loading also includes other kinds of strain on the speech organs. These include all kinds of muscular strain in the speech organs, similarly as usage of any other muscles will experience strain if used for an extended period of time. However, researchers' largest interest lies in stress exerted on the vocal folds.

== Effect of speaking environment ==
Several studies in vocal loading show that the speaking environment does have a significant impact on vocal loading. Still, the exact details are debated. Most scientists agree on the effect of the following environmental properties:

- air humidity - dry air is thought to increase the stress experienced in the vocal folds, however, this has not been proven
- hydration - dehydration may increase effects of stress inflicted on the vocal folds
- background noise - people tend to speak louder when background noise is present, even when it isn't necessary. Increasing speaking volume increases stress inflicted on the vocal folds
- pitch - Using a higher or lower pitch than normal will also increase laryngeal stress.
- voice quality - Using a vocal quality which differs from that habitually used is thought to increase laryngeal stress.

In addition, smoking and other types of air pollution might have a negative effect on voice production organs.

== Symptoms ==
Objective evaluation or measurement of vocal loading is very difficult due to the tight coupling of the experienced psychological and physiological stress. However, there are some typical symptoms that can be objectively measured. Firstly, the pitch range of the voice will decrease. Pitch range indicates the possible pitches that can be spoken. When a voice is loaded, the upper pitch limit will decrease and the lower pitch limit will rise. Similarly, the volume range will decrease.

Secondly, an increase in the hoarseness and strain of a voice can often be heard. Unfortunately, both properties are difficult to measure objectively, and only perceptual evaluations can be performed.

== Voice care ==
Regularly, the question arises of how one should use one's voice to minimize tiring in the vocal organs. This is encompassed in the study of vocology, the science and practice of voice habilitation. Basically, a normal, relaxed way of speech is the optimal method for voice production, in both speech and singing. Any excess force used when speaking will increase tiring. The speaker should drink enough water and the air humidity level should be normal or higher. No background noise should be present or, if not possible, the voice should be amplified. Smoking is discouraged.

== See also ==
- Human voice
- Vocal rest
