= Phoniatrics =

Sudy and treatment of organs involved in speech production

Phoniatrics or phoniatry is the study and treatment of organs involved in speech production, mainly the mouth, throat (larynx), vocal cords, and lungs. Problems treated in phoniatrics include dysfunction of the vocal cords, cancer of the vocal cords or larynx, inability to control the speech organs properly (speech disorders, such as muteness or speech sound disorder), and vocal loading problems.

According to the Union of European Phoniatricians, phoniatrics is "the medical specialty dealing with voice, speech, language, hearing and swallowing disorders".
