= Chris Cagle discography =

- Studio albums: 5
- Compilation albums: 3
- Singles: 16
- Music videos: 9

The discography of Chris Cagle, an American country music singer, consists of five studio albums and three compilation albums. Additionally, he has released sixteen singles to country radio. Nine of those singles have been in the top twenty positions on the U.S. Billboard Hot Country Songs chart: "My Love Goes On and On", "Laredo", "What a Beautiful Day", "Chicks Dig It", "Miss Me Baby", "What Kinda Gone", "Got My Country On", "Let There Be Cowgirls" and "I Breathe In, I Breathe Out", which reached Number One in 2001.

== Albums ==
=== Studio albums ===
| Title | Album details | Peak positions | | Certifications |
| Title | Album details | US Country | US | Certifications |
|---|---|---|---|---|
| Play It Loud (Note: Play It Loud was re-issued in 2001 on Capitol Nashville with two tracks added.) | Release date: October 24, 2000; Label: Virgin Records Nashville; Formats: CD, cassette | 19 | 164 | US: Gold |
| Chris Cagle | Release date: April 1, 2003; Label: Capitol Nashville; Formats: CD | 1 | 15 | US: Gold |
| Anywhere but Here | Release date: October 4, 2005; Label: Capitol Nashville; Formats: CD, music download | 4 | 24 | |
| My Life's Been a Country Song | Release date: February 19, 2008; Label: Capitol Nashville; Formats: CD, music download | 1 | 8 | |
| Back in the Saddle | Release date: June 26, 2012; Label: Bigger Picture Music Group; Formats: CD, music download | 6 | 27 | |

=== Compilation albums ===
| Title | Album details | Peak positions |
| Title | Album details | US Country |
|---|---|---|
| The Best of Chris Cagle | Release date: February 9, 2010; Label: Capitol Nashville; Formats: CD, music download | 34 |
| 10 Great Songs | Release date: April 3, 2012; Label: Capitol Nashville; Formats: CD, music download | 68 |
| Icon | Release date: March 19, 2013; Label: Capitol Nashville; Formats: CD, music download | 48 |

== Singles ==
| Year | Single | Peak positions | | | | | Album |
| Year | Single | US Country Songs | US Country Airplay | US | CAN Country (Note: Chart positions from RPM in 2000, Radio & Records in 2005, and Billboard Canada Country from 2007 to present.) | CAN | Album |
|---|---|---|---|---|---|---|---|
| 2000 | "My Love Goes On and On" | 15 | | 76 | 32 (Note: "My Love Goes On and On" reached number 32 when RPM ceased publication in November 2000.) | — | Play It Loud |
| 2001 | "Laredo" | 8 | | 60 | — | — | Play It Loud |
| 2001 | "I Breathe In, I Breathe Out" (Note: "I Breathe In, I Breathe Out" is only on later presses of Play It Loud.) | 1 | | 35 | — | — | Play It Loud |
| 2002 | "Country by the Grace of God" | 33 | | — | — | — | Play It Loud |
| 2002 | "What a Beautiful Day" | 4 | | 41 | — | — | Chris Cagle |
| 2003 | "Chicks Dig It" | 5 | | 53 | — | — | Chris Cagle |
| 2004 | "I'd Be Lying" | 39 | | — | — | — | Chris Cagle |
| 2005 | "Miss Me Baby" | 12 | | 67 | 29 | — | Anywhere but Here |
| 2006 | "Wal-Mart Parking Lot" | 42 | | — | — | — | Anywhere but Here |
| 2006 | "Anywhere but Here" | 52 | | — | — | — | Anywhere but Here |
| 2007 | "What Kinda Gone" | 3 | | 54 | 4 | 69 | My Life's Been a Country Song |
| 2008 | "No Love Songs" | 53 | | — | — | — | My Life's Been a Country Song |
| 2008 | "Never Ever Gone" | — | | — | — | — | My Life's Been a Country Song |
| 2011 | "Got My Country On" | 12 | | 86 | 42 | — | Back in the Saddle |
| 2012 | "Let There Be Cowgirls" | 26 | 16 | 96 | — | — | Back in the Saddle |
| 2013 | "Dance Baby Dance" | — | 44 | — | — | — | Back in the Saddle |
"—" denotes releases that did not chart

== Music videos ==
| Year | Video | Director |
|---|---|---|
| 2000 | "My Love Goes On and On" | Eric Welch |
| 2001 | "Laredo" | Eric Welch |
| 2001 | "I Breathe In, I Breathe Out" | Eric Welch |
| 2002 | "Country by the Grace of God" | Eric Welch |
| 2003 | "What a Beautiful Day" | Eric Welch/Chris Cagle |
| 2003 | "Chicks Dig It" | Peter Zavadil |
| 2005 | "Miss Me Baby" | Eric Welch |
| 2006 | "Wal-Mart Parking Lot" | Sam Erickson |
| 2011 | "Got My Country On" | Marcel |
