= Damage discography =

- Studio albums: 3
- EPs: 3
- Singles: 11

The discography of Damage, a British boy band, consists of two studio albums and three extended plays.

== Discography ==
=== Studio albums ===
List of albums, with selected chart positions and certifications
| Title | Album details | Peak chart positions | | | | | | Certifications |
| Title | Album details | UK | UK R&B | AUS | NL | SCO | TAW | Certifications |
|---|---|---|---|---|---|---|---|---|
| Forever | Released: 7 April 1997; Formats: LP, CD, cassette; Labels: Big Life Records | 13 | 4 | 67 | 57 | 95 | 3 | BPI: Silver |
| Since You've Been Gone | Released: 2 April 2001; Formats: CD, cassette; Labels: Cooltempo | 16 | 2 | — | 55 | — | — | BPI: Gold |
"—" denotes releases that did not chart or were not released in that territory.

=== Extended plays ===
List of albums
| Title | Album details |
|---|---|
| Live&Liberated | Released: April 2002; Formats: 12"; Label: Set It Off Management |
| Acoustically Yours | Released: 27 October 2014; Formats: Digital download; Labels: Independent |
| Live at the BBC | Released: 21 July 2017; Formats: Digital download; Label: Prism Leisure |

== Singles ==
=== As lead artist ===
List of singles, with selected chart positions and certifications
| Title | Year | Peak chart positions | | | | | | | Certifications | Album |
| Title | Year | UK | UK R&B | AUS | GER | NL | NZ | SCO | Certifications | Album |
|---|---|---|---|---|---|---|---|---|---|---|
| "What U C (Iz What U Get)" | 1995 | 90 | 21 | — | — | — | — | — | | Non-album single |
| "Anything" (featuring Lil' Cease) | 1996 | 68 | 7 | — | — | — | — | — | | Forever |
| "Love II Love" | 1996 | 12 | 2 | 92 | — | — | 50 | — | | Forever |
| "Forever" | 1996 | 6 | 1 | 13 | — | — | — | — | BPI: Silver; ARIA: Gold | Forever |
| "Love Guaranteed" | 1997 | 7 | 2 | — | — | — | — | — | | Forever |
| "Wonderful Tonight" | 1997 | 3 | 1 | 39 | 72 | 26 | 34 | — | BPI: Silver | Forever |
| "Love Lady" | 1997 | 33 | 8 | — | — | — | — | — | | Forever |
| "Ghetto Romance" | 2000 | 7 | 1 | — | — | — | — | — | | Since You've Been Gone |
| "Rumours" | 2000 | 22 | 2 | — | — | — | — | | | Since You've Been Gone |
| "Still Be Lovin' You" | 2001 | 11 | 3 | — | — | — | — | — | | Since You've Been Gone |
| "So What If I?" | 2001 | 12 | 5 | — | — | — | — | — | | Since You've Been Gone |
| "After the Love Has Gone" | 2001 | 42 | 13 | — | — | — | — | — | | Since You've Been Gone |
| "Hey Girl" | 2014 | — | — | — | — | — | — | — | | Acoustically Yours |
"—" denotes releases that did not chart or were not released in that territory.

=== As featured artist ===
| Title | Year | Album |
|---|---|---|
| "Key to the World" (Truce featuring Damage) | 1998 | Non-album single |

=== Promotional singles ===
| Title | Year | Album |
|---|---|---|
| "Girlfriend" | 1995 | Forever |
| "I Don't Know" (featuring Emma Bunton) | 2001 | Since You've Been Gone |
