= The Best of Chris Cagle =

Greatest hits album by Chris Cagle
- Released: February 9, 2010
- Recorded: 2000–2008
- Genre: Country
- Length: 57:59
- Label: Capitol Nashville
- Producer: various original producers

Chris Cagle chronology
My Life's Been a Country Song (2008)	The Best of Chris Cagle (2010)	Back in the Saddle (2012)

Professional ratings
Review scores
Source	Rating
Allmusic	4/5 stars

The Best of Chris Cagle is the only compilation album by American country music artist Chris Cagle. It was released on February 9, 2010, via Capitol Records Nashville. The album features Cagle's 5 top ten U.S. Billboard Hot Country Songs.

== Critical reception ==
Stephen Thomas Erlewine of Allmusic rated the compilation four stars out of five, commending the album's non-chronological pacing by saying that it "open[s] and clos[es] with bursts of energy and spend[s] a lot of time riding a midtempo in the middle." He also thought that the compilation showed Cagle's artistic consistency.

== Track listing ==
No.	Title	Writer(s)	Length
1.	"Hey Y'all"	Chris Cagle, Monty Powell	3:53
2.	"Country by the Grace of God"	Cagle, M. Jason Greene, Bryan Wayne	3:28
3.	"What a Beautiful Day"	Cagle, Powell	3:45
4.	"I Breathe In, I Breathe Out"	Cagle, Jon Robbin	4:04
5.	"My Life's Been a Country Song"	John Wiggins, Clay Mills	3:18
6.	"Wal-Mart Parking Lot"	Brett James	4:22
7.	"I'd Be Lying"	Cagle	4:26
8.	"My Love Goes On and On"	Cagle, Don Pfrimmer	3:02
9.	"What Kinda Gone"	Chip Davis, Dave Berg, Candy Cameron	3:01
10.	"Look at What I've Done"	Cagle, Powell, Anna Wilson	4:55
11.	"Anywhere but Here"	D. Vincent Williams, Wendell Mobley	4:04
12.	"Laredo"	Cagle	3:49
13.	"Miss Me Baby"	Cagle, Powell	3:54
14.	"No Love Songs"	George Teren, Craig Wiseman	3:59
15.	"Chicks Dig It"	Cagle, Charlie Crowe	3:59

== Chart performance ==
Chart (2010)	Peak position
U.S. Billboard Top Country Albums	34
