= Goodnight Sweetheart =

Goodnight Sweetheart may refer to:

== Film and television ==
- Goodnight, Sweetheart (film), a 1944 American comedy film
- Goodnight Sweetheart (TV series), a 1993–1999 British sitcom
- "Goodnight Sweetheart" (All Saints), a 1998 TV episode

== Music ==
- Goodnight Sweetheart (album), by David Kersh, 1996
- "Goodnight Sweetheart" (Joe Diffie song), 1992; covered by David Kersh, 1996
- "Goodnight Sweetheart" (Ray Noble, Jimmy Campbell and Reg Connelly song), 1931
- "Goodnite, Sweetheart, Goodnite", a song written by Calvin Carter and James "Pookie" Hudson, 1954
