= If I Never Stop Loving You =

Studio album by David Kersh
- Released: February 17, 1998
- Recorded: March–October 1997
- Genre: Country
- Length: 38:35
- Label: Curb
- Producer: Pat McMakin

David Kersh chronology
Goodnight Sweetheart (1996)	If I Never Stop Loving You (1998)

Singles from If I Never Stop Loving You
- 1. "If I Never Stop Loving You" Released: December 1, 1997

Professional ratings
Review scores
Source	Rating
Allmusic	3/5 stars

If I Never Stop Loving You is the second and final studio album by American country music artist David Kersh. Its title track was a Top 5 hit on the country music charts in 1998; "Wonderful Tonight" (a cover of Eric Clapton's single) and "Something to Think About" were also released as singles. Also covered here is Faron Young's 1961 hit "Hello Walls".

"I Breathe In, I Breathe Out" was co-written by Chris Cagle, who had not yet begun his own major-label recording career. Although Kersh's version was not released as a single, Cagle would later cut the song for his 2001 album Play It Loud.

== Track listing ==
No.	Title	Writer(s)	Length
1.	"If I Never Stop Loving You"	Skip Ewing, Donny Kees	3:35
2.	"The Need"	David Malloy, Tom Shapiro, Sunny Russ	3:33
3.	"The Sudden Stop"	Kelly Garrett, Billy Spencer	3:36
4.	"Wonderful Tonight"	Eric Clapton	3:39
5.	"Anything with Wheels"	Billy Burnette, Phil Barnhart	3:30
6.	"I Breathe In, I Breathe Out"	Jon Robbin, Chris Cagle	3:46
7.	"Something to Think About"	Tim Nichols, Tony Martin	3:16
8.	"It's Out of My Hands"	Terry Burns, Randi Michaels	3:49
9.	"Hello Walls"	Willie Nelson	2:38
10.	"As If I Didn't Know"	Dean Dillon, Roger Springer	4:01
11.	"The Faster I Go"	Larry Boone, Paul Nelson, John Rich	3:09

== Personnel ==
- Eddie Bayers - drums, percussion, Hammond B3 organ
- Bruce Bouton - steel guitar
- Dennis Burnside - piano, organ, keyboards
- John Carroll - electric guitar solo on "Hello Walls" and "The Faster I Go"
- Mark Casstevens - acoustic guitar
- J.T. Corenflos - electric guitar
- Thom Flora - background vocals
- Larry Franklin - fiddle
- Paul Franklin - steel guitar, Pedabro
- Wes Hightower - background vocals
- Stephen Hinson - steel guitar
- John Hughey - steel guitar
- Bill Hullett - acoustic guitar
- Brent Mason - electric guitar
- Michael Rhodes - bass guitar
- Matt Rollings - piano on "It's Out of My Hands"
- Michael Stevens - electric guitar
- Glenn Worf - bass guitar
- Curtis Young - background vocals

== Charts ==
=== Weekly charts ===
Chart (1998)	Peak position
US Billboard 200	134
US Top Country Albums (Billboard)	13
US Heatseekers Albums (Billboard)	4

=== Year-end charts ===
Chart (1998)	Position
US Top Country Albums (Billboard)	58
