= Wonderful Tonight =

1977 single by Eric Clapton

Single by Eric Clapton

from the album Slowhand
- B-side: "Peaches and Diesel"
- Released: 10 March 1978
- Genre: Soft rock
- Length: 3:45
- Label: RSO
- Songwriter: Eric Clapton
- Producer: Glyn Johns

Eric Clapton singles chronology
"Lay Down Sally" (1977)	"Wonderful Tonight" (1978)	"Promises" (1978)

"Wonderful Tonight" is a song written and performed by English singer Eric Clapton. The ballad was included on Clapton's 1977 album Slowhand. Clapton wrote the song on his 1974 Martin D-28 guitar about Pattie Boyd. The female vocal harmonies on the song are provided by Marcella Detroit (then Marcy Levy) and Yvonne Elliman. It peaked at number 16 on the Billboard Hot 100 on 15 July 1978, spending seven weeks in the top 40. In Canada it was in the top 40 for nine weeks.

== Background ==
On 7 September 1976, Eric Clapton wrote "Wonderful Tonight" for then-girlfriend Pattie Boyd while waiting for her to get ready to attend Paul and Linda McCartney's annual Buddy Holly party. The song is mentioned in her 2007 autobiographical book Wonderful Today.

== Song meaning ==
British comedian and former radio producer Karl Pilkington believed this song to be about a 'little fella in a wheelchair' during a 2005 broadcast of the Ricky & Steve Show on XFM, a regional London radio station in the UK. He believed this for no apparent reason, and was profusely mocked by co-presenters Ricky Gervais and Stephen Merchant for this interpretation.

== Reception ==
Billboard described "Wonderful Tonight" as "perhaps Clapton's prettiest and mellowest love ballad in some time." Billboard particularly praised Clapton's guitar playing during the interludes. Cash Box said that "Eric’s singing is superbly understated; the guitar work is simple and evocative" and praised "the gentle beat and organ accompaniment." Record World called it a "light, pretty ballad from [the album] Slowhand that should also move quickly up the charts" and praised Clapton's singing.

== Personnel ==
- Eric Clapton – lead vocals, lead and rhythm guitar
- George Terry – rhythm guitar
- Dick Sims – Fender Rhodes and Hammond organ
- Carl Radle – bass guitar
- Jamie Oldaker – drums and percussion
- Marcy Levy and Yvonne Elliman – harmony and backing vocals

== Performance ==
In 1988, Clapton appeared in the Nelson Mandela 70th Birthday Tribute concert as a guest guitarist for Dire Straits. The group became his backing musicians for a surprise performance of "Wonderful Tonight" during their set.

== Charts ==
=== Weekly charts ===
Chart (1978)	Peak position
Canada (CHUM)	16
Canada Top Singles (RPM)	15
France (IFOP)	3
Ireland (IRMA)	13
New Zealand (Recorded Music NZ)	26
US Billboard Hot 100	16
US Billboard Adult Contemporary	39

Chart (1988)	Peak position
Belgium (Ultratop 50 Flanders)	5
Belgium (VRT Top 30 Flanders)	6
Netherlands (Dutch Top 40)	3
Netherlands (Single Top 100)	2

Chart (1991–1992)	Peak position
Japan International Singles (Oricon)	1
UK Singles (Official Charts) Live version	30

Chart (2009)	Peak position
UK Singles (OCC)	81

=== Year-end charts ===
Chart (1978)	Position
Canadian Top Singles (RPM)	144

Chart (1988)	Position
Belgium (Ultratop 50 Flanders)	39
Netherlands (Dutch Top 40)	14
Netherlands (Single Top 100)	9

== Certifications ==
Certifications and sales for "Wonderful Tonight"
Region	Certification	Certified units/sales
Denmark (IFPI Danmark)	Platinum	90,000^{‡}
Italy (FIMI)	Gold	35,000^{‡}
Japan (RIAJ)	Million	1,000,000^{^}
New Zealand (RMNZ)	3× Platinum	90,000^{‡}
United Kingdom (BPI)	Platinum	600,000^{‡}
United States (RIAA)	Gold	500,000^{^}
^{^} Shipments figures based on certification alone.^{‡} Sales+streaming figures based on certification alone.

== Cover versions ==
=== Damage version ===
"Wonderful Tonight"

Single by Damage

from the album Forever
- B-side: "I'm Ready"
- Released: 28 April 1997
- Length: 4:01
- Label: Big Life
- Songwriter: Eric Clapton
- Producer: Steve Mac

Damage singles chronology
"Love Guaranteed" (1997)	"Wonderful Tonight" (1997)	"Love Lady" (1997)

British R&B group Damage covered "Wonderful Tonight" and released it as the fifth single from their debut studio album, Forever (1997), in April 1997. The single peaked at number three on the UK Singles Chart, becoming the band's highest-charting single. The song is prominently performed by Coreé Richards, with little vocal input from any other members of the band. The music video features the band performing the song in a recording studio with cut scenes of a girl preparing to go on a night out. The B-side, "I'm Ready", launched the career of Craig David, being the first song he had ever written to be released by himself or another artist.

==== Track listings ====
- UK CD1
1. "Wonderful Tonight"
2. "I'm Ready" (Rashaan J Bromfield, Coreé Richards, Noel Simpson, Jade Jones, Andrez Harriott, Craig David)
3. "Wonderful Tonight" (Ethnic Boyz Mix)
- UK CD2
1. "Wonderful Tonight" (acoustic mix)
2. "Just My Imagination" (Norman Whitfield, Barrett Strong)
3. "Love II Love" (acoustic mix)
- UK cassette single
1. "Wonderful Tonight"
2. "I'm Ready" (Bromfield, Richards, Simpson, Jones, Harriott, David)

==== Charts ====
Weekly charts

Chart (1997)	Peak position
Australia (ARIA)	39
Estonia (Eesti Top 20)	11
Europe (Eurochart Hot 100)	30
Ireland (IRMA)	15
Netherlands (Dutch Top 40)	26
Netherlands (Single Top 100)	26
New Zealand (Recorded Music NZ)	34
Scottish Singles Sales (Official Charts)	12
UK Singles (Official Charts)	3
UK Airplay (Music Week)	19
UK Indie (Music Week)	1

Year-end charts

Chart (1997)	Position
UK Singles (OCC)	77

==== Certifications ====
Region	Certification	Certified units/sales
United Kingdom (BPI)	Silver	200,000^{‡}
^{‡} Sales+streaming figures based on certification alone.

==== Release history ====
Region	Date	Format(s)	Label(s)	Ref.
United Kingdom	28 April 1997	CD; cassette	Big Life	
United States	9 September 1997	Rhythmic contemporary; contemporary hit radio	Critique	

=== David Kersh version ===
"Wonderful Tonight"

Single by David Kersh

from the album If I Never Stop Loving You
- Released: 14 March 1998
- Genre: Country
- Label: Curb
- Songwriter: Eric Clapton
- Producer: Pat McMakin

David Kersh singles chronology
"If I Never Stop Loving You" (1997)	"Wonderful Tonight" (1998)	"Something to Think About" (1998)

"Wonderful Tonight" was covered by country singer David Kersh on his album If I Never Stop Loving You in 1998. His version went to number 29 on the Hot Country Songs chart.

==== Charts ====
Chart (1998)	Peak position
Canada Country Singles (RPM)	45
US Hot Country Songs (Billboard)	29

=== Butch Baker version ===
The song was covered by country music singer Butch Baker on his album We Will, whose rendition reached number 66 on the Billboard Hot Country Songs chart in 1989.
