= Love Lady (Damage song) =

Single by Damage

from the album Forever
- B-side: "Storyteller"
- Released: 28 July 1997
- Genre: R&B
- Length: 3:36
- Label: Big Life Records
- Songwriters: Filo Brown, Mervyn Africa, Femi "Fem" Williams
- Producer: Femi "Fem" Williams

Damage singles chronology
"Wonderful Tonight" (1997)	"Love Lady" (1997)	"Ghetto Romance" (2000)

"Love Lady" is a single by British R&B group Damage, released on 28 July 1997 by Big Life Records as the sixth and final single from the band's debut album, Forever (1997). The song peaked at No. 33 on the UK Singles Chart, becoming the band's second-worst performing single from the album. The song was the band's first single to have been produced by Femi Fem, and was heavily remixed for its release as a single. The music video features the band performing the song in the middle of the desert. It does not appear online anywhere and has never been released commercially, however it was regularly re-broadcast on The Vault as part of the channel's Damage: Our Career in Music special. Jade Jones refers to it as his favorite video.

== Critical reception ==
Kirstin Watson from Smash Hits gave the song a top score of five out of five and named it a Smash Hit, writing, "Wa-hey, it's another swing-tastic tune from The Most Romantic Men in PopTM and we absolutely flippin' love it. 'Love Lady' is a smoochy, swayey, mushy 'number' that'll have you slidin' straight into the lurve one. Ras, Jade, Andrez, Coree and Noel are obviously still in romantic mode after their last big hit 'Wonderful Tonight' and all I can say is with R'n'B as sweet as this just keep it coming fellas! A UK Garage version by Dubaholics was also released in 1997 on 12” vinyl "

== Track listing ==
- CD1
1. "Love Lady" (Femi Fem's Radio Mix)
2. "Love Lady" (Filo Freak Remix)
3. "Love Lady" (Lucas Remix)
4. "Love Lady" (MVP First Born Mix)
- CD2
1. "Love Lady" (Da Funkstarz House Full Vocal Edit)
2. "Love Lady" (Da Funkstarz Vocal Dub)
3. "Love Lady" (Dubaholics Dub)
4. "Love Lady" (Groove Chronicles Groove Mix)
5. "Love Lady" (Da Funkstarz Epic Camouflage Dub)
6. "Love Lady" (Femi Fem's Radio Mix)
- 12" vinyl
1. "Love Lady" (Femi Fem's Radio Mix)
2. "Love Lady" (Lucas Remix)
3. "Storyteller" (Linslee Campbell, Michelle Escoffery, Simpson, Harriott, produced by Linslee)
4. "Love Lady" (Lucas Remix Instrumental)
5. "Love Lady" (MVP First Born Mix)
- Cassette
1. "Love Lady" (Femi Fem's Radio Mix)
2. "Love Lady" (Filo Freak Remix)
- 12" vinyl - Red (Limited Edition of 500)
1. "Love Lady" (Lucas Remix)
2. "Love Lady" (MVP First Born Mix)
3. "Love Lady" (Groove Chronicles Groove Mix)
- 12" vinyl - Blue (Limited Edition of 500)"
1. "Love Lady" (Da Funkstarz House Full Vocal Edit)
2. "Love Lady" (Da Funkstarz Vocal Dub)
3. "Love Lady" (Da Funkstarz Epic Camouflage Dub)
4. "Love Lady" (Dubaholics Dub)
