= Love Guaranteed =

Love Guaranteed may refer to:

- "Love Guaranteed" (song), by Damage
- Love Guaranteed (TV series), a Hong Kong television series
- Love, Guaranteed, a 2020 American romantic comedy film
