= Anything (Damage song) =

Single by Damage featuring Lil' Cease

from the album Forever
- B-side: "Everything"
- Released: 8 July 1996
- Genre: R&B, pop
- Length: 3:59
- Label: Big Life Records
- Songwriter(s): Terri Robinson, Dominic Owen, Fabian Hamilton
- Producer(s): High Class

Damage featuring Lil' Cease singles chronology
"What U C Iz What U Get" (1995)	"Anything" (1996)	"Love II Love" (1996)

"Anything" is the major label debut single from British boy band Damage, released on 8 July 1996. It is the band's second single overall, having released "What U C Iz What U Get" in 1995 before they signed a major record deal. "Anything" was released as the lead single from their debut studio album, Forever, reaching #68 on the UK Singles Chart. The song features an uncredited appearance from rapper Lil' Cease who performs a rap before the final chorus. A music video was created for the track, but it has never been released commercially and does not appear anywhere online. The video also does not feature during the Damage: Our Career in Music special which was regularly broadcast on The Vault.

== Track listing ==
- CD
1. "Anything I want" [Radio Mix] - 4:58
2. "Anything" [Kojo Mix] - 5:19
3. "Everything" [Jones/Bromfield/Richards/Simpson/Harriott, produced by Don-E] - 4:50
4. "Anything" [Extended Club Mix] - 4:58
- Cassette
1. "Anything" [Radio Mix] - 4:58
2. "Everything" - 4:50
- 12" vinyl
1. "Anything" [Extended Club Mix] - 4:58
2. "Anything" [Instrumental] - 4:20
3. "Everything" - 4:50
4. "Anything" [Kojo Mix] - 5:19
