= Another You (disambiguation) =

Another You is a 1991 American comedy film.

Another You may also refer to:

- "Another You" (David Kersh song), 1997 song by David Kersh
- "Another You", song by John Rich from his 2009 album Son of a Preacher Man
- "Another You" (Armin van Buuren song), 2015 song by Armin van Buuren featuring Mr. Probz
- "Another You", 2018 song by Breakbot featuring Ruckazoid
- "Another You", 2006 song by Cascada from their album Everytime We Touch
