= Day In, Day Out =

Day In, Day Out may refer to:

- "Day In, Day Out" (1939 song), a song written by Rube Bloom and Johnny Mercer, recorded by numerous artists
- "Day-In Day-Out", a song by David Bowie from his 1987 album Never Let Me Down
- "Day In, Day Out" (David Kersh song), a 1997 song by American country singer David Kersh
- "Day In Day Out" (Feeder song), a 1999 song by British rock band Feeder
- "Day In Day Out", a song by Catch 22 from their 1998 album Keasbey Nights

== See also ==
- "Digital" (Joy Division song), a 1978 song by the British band Joy Division, in which the lyrics "day in, day out" are featured prominently
