= What a Beautiful Day =

What a Beautiful Day may refer to:

- What a Beautiful Day (film), a 2011 Italian film directed by Gennaro Nunziante
- "What a Beautiful Day" (song), a 2002 song by Chris Cagle
- "What a Beautiful Day", a song by the Levellers from the 1997 album Mouth to Mouth
