= Forever (Damage album) =

Studio album by Damage
- Released: 7 April 1997
- Length: 52:23
- Label: Big Life
- Producers: Linslee Campbell; Cutfather & Joe; Dodge; The Ethnic Boyz; Fabian Hamilton; Steve Mac; Dominic Owen; Bryan Powell; Terri Robinson; Femi "Fem" Williams

Damage chronology
Forever (1997)	Since You've Been Gone (2001)

Singles from Forever
- 1. "Anything" Released: 8 July 1996; 2. "Love II Love" Released: 30 September 1996; 3. "Forever" Released: 7 December 1996; 4. "Love Guaranteed" Released: 1 March 1997; 5. "Wonderful Tonight" Released: 28 April 1997; 6. "Love Lady" Released: 28 July 1997

Forever is the debut studio album by British boyband Damage. It was released on 7 April 1997 through Big Life Records. Produced by Cutfather & Joe, Dodge, Steve Mac, and others, it reached number 13 on the UK Albums Chart and was certified Silver by the British Phonographic Industry (BPI) on 1 May 1997. The highest-charting single from the album was a cover of the Eric Clapton cover "Wonderful Tonight", which peaked at number three on the UK Singles Chart. Other hits to feature on the album include the album's title track "Forever", "Love Guaranteed" and one of the band's signature songs, "Love II Love."

== Track listing ==
Forever track listing
No.	Title	Writer(s)	Producer(s)	Length
1.	"Reminder"	Coreé Richards; Noel Simpson; Jade Jones; Andrez Harriott; Rahsaan J Bromfield	Dodge	2:38
2.	"Love II Love"	Wayne Hector; Ali Tennant; Bryan Powell	Powell; Dominic Owen; Aliway^{[a]}	4:27
3.	"Love Guaranteed"	Powell; Jimmy Harris III; Terry Lewis	Cutfather & Joe; Aliway^{[a]}; Powell^{[b]}	4:34
4.	"Girlfriend (The Morning After)"	Richards; Bromfield; Dodge McLean	Dodge; Don-E^{[c]}	7:19
5.	"Let It Be Me"	Steve Mac; Richards; Jones; Aliway	Linslee Campbell	4:45
6.	"Wonderful Tonight (Mission)"	Eric Clapton	Mac	5:14
7.	"Love Lady"	Filo Brown; Mervyn Africa; Femi "Fem" Williams	Fem	5:58
8.	"Anything (Personal Business)"	Terri Robinson; Dominic Owen; Fabian Hamilton	Robinson; Owen; Hamilton; Junior Giscombe^{[a]}	6:07
9.	"Be My Baby (M-Pyre)"	Robinson; Owen; Hamilton	Robinson; Owen; Hamilton; Giscombe^{[a]}	8:33
10.	"Forever (Lady of Soul)"	Mac; Hector; Tennant; Johnson	Mac	7:29
11.	"Do Me That Way"	Hector; Tennant; Johnson; Davies	The Ethnic Boyz; Aliway^{[a]}; Mark Beswick^{[a]}	3:48
12.	"Storyteller"	Linslee Campbell; Michelle Escoffery; Simpson; Harriott	Campbell; Shelle^{[a]}; Damage^{[a]}	5:18
13.	"In Your Eyes (One Last Time)"	Campbell; Escoffery; Richards; Bromfield	Campbell; Shelle^{[a]}; Damage^{[a]}	12:13
Total length:				52:23

Notes

- ^{^[a]} signifies vocal producer(s)
- ^{^[b]} signifies additional producer(s)
- ^{^[c]} signifies original producer(s)

== Charts ==
Weekly chart performance for Forever
Chart (1997)	Peak position
Australian Albums (ARIA)	67
Dutch Albums (Album Top 100)	57
European Albums Chart	46
Scottish Albums (OCC)	95
Singapore Albums (SPVA)	10
Taiwan Albums (IFPI)	3
UK Albums (OCC)	13

== Certifications ==
Certifications for Forever
Region	Certification	Certified units/sales
United Kingdom (BPI)	Silver	60,000^{^}
^{^} Shipments figures based on certification alone.
