= Chris Cagle =

American singer-songwriter

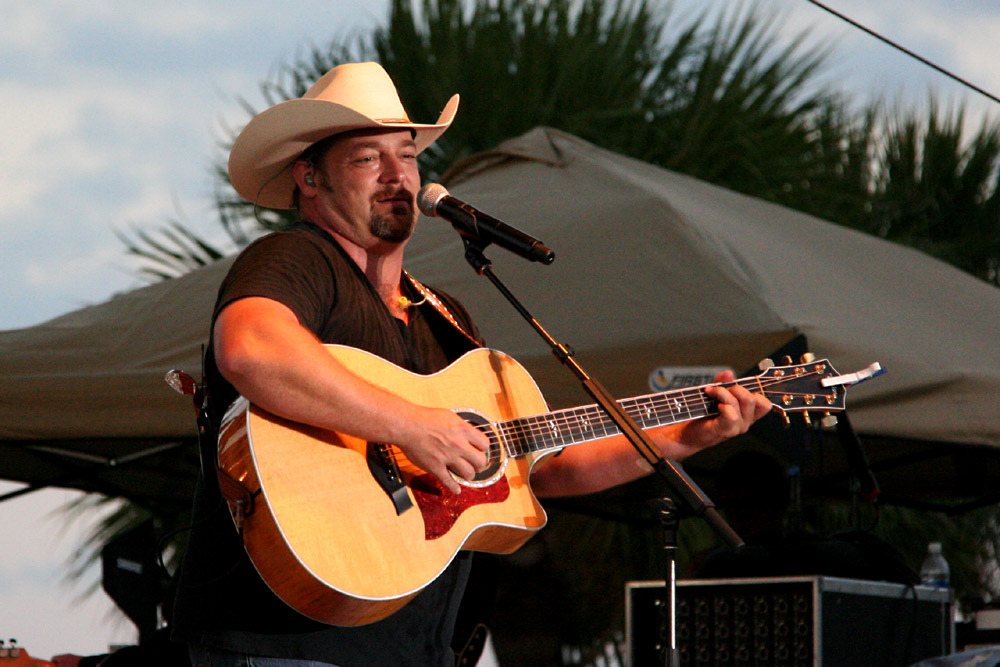
- Chris Cagle in October 2010

Background information
- Born: Christopher Norris Cagle; November 10, 1968 (age 57); DeRidder, Louisiana, U.S.
- Origin: Nashville, Tennessee, U.S.
- Genres: Country
- Occupation: Singer-songwriter
- Instruments: Vocals, guitar
- Years active: 1996–2015, 2019–present
- Labels: Virgin Nashville; Capitol Nashville; Bigger Picture
- Website: http://chriscagle.com

Christopher Norris Cagle (born November 10, 1968) is an American country music artist. He was first known for writing songs for David Kersh before signing to Virgin Records Nashville in 2000. Cagle made his debut on Billboard Hot Country Singles & Tracks (now Hot Country Songs) charts with "My Love Goes On and On", the first single from his debut album Play It Loud. The album, which was certified gold in the US, also produced the Top 10 "Laredo" and "I Breathe In, I Breathe Out", his only No. 1 hit.

Play It Loud was followed in 2002 by Chris Cagle, released on Capitol Records Nashville. A gold album in the United States, it produced the Top 5 hits "What a Beautiful Day" and "Chicks Dig It". Anywhere but Here, his third album, followed in 2005 and produced the No. 12 hit "Miss Me Baby". A fourth studio album, titled My Life's Been a Country Song, was released in 2008, and its lead-off single, "What Kinda Gone", peaked at No. 3 on the country music chart in early 2008. After exiting Capitol in 2008, he signed with Bigger Picture Music Group in 2011, before retiring from music in 2015.

== Biography ==
Christopher Norris Cagle was born in DeRidder, Louisiana, on November 10, 1968; by the time he was 4, his family had moved to Sugar Land, Texas, just outside Houston. He stayed there until moving to Baytown, Texas, in high school. During his high school years, he took piano lessons before switching to guitar. His senior year he moved to White Settlement, Texas, where he attended Brewer High School before moving back to Baytown and graduating from Ross S. Sterling High School in 1987. He attended the University of Texas at Arlington for one year. He skipped his finance courses to audit music classes, and performed at night in nearby clubs. He also spent a brief period attending classes at Lee College in Baytown. Cagle later dropped out of college and moved to Nashville in 1994 at the behest of entertainment attorney Rod Phelps. Chris told Phelps that he "...had no place to live, no job, and no money." Phelps hired Cagle as a nanny for his and wife Sheila Wagnon's three daughters, Shayna, Ashley, and Tiffany. Chris remained for several months. While in Nashville, Cagle was waiting tables and tending bar while working to improve himself as a songwriter. One big break came when he met the legendary Harlan Howard, who was so impressed with Chris's songwriting progress that he was the first to publish one of his songs. Chris then landed a publishing deal and had songs recorded by David Kersh. A woman he met while waiting tables led him to Virgin Records head Scott Hendricks, who signed him to a record deal.

== Musical career ==
For the next five years he worked odd jobs throughout Nashville, eventually landing a songwriting deal and co-writing album tracks for David Kersh. While working at a restaurant, he was discovered by an agent of the newly formed Nashville division of Virgin Records, and was signed to a recording deal with the label in 2000.

=== 2000–2002: Play It Loud ===
Cagle's first album, Play It Loud, was issued in mid-2000. Serving as its lead-off single was "My Love Goes On and On", which reached No. 15 on Billboard Hot Country Singles & Tracks (now Hot Country Songs), while "Laredo", its follow-up, became his first Top Ten hit in mid-2001. After Virgin closed in 2001, the album was re-issued on Capitol Records with "I Breathe In, I Breathe Out" (which was also one of the songs that he had written for David Kersh in the late 1990s) added as a bonus track. Its b-side, "Country by the Grace of God", was the fourth and final single from the album. "I Breathe In, I Breathe Out" became his only No. 1 hit in early 2002. By the end of the year, Play It Loud had been certified gold in the United States.

=== 2003–2004: Chris Cagle ===
Capitol released Cagle's second album, Chris Cagle, in the middle of 2003. His second consecutive gold album, it produced the Top 5 singles "What a Beautiful Day" and "Chicks Dig It", as well as the No. 39 "I'd Be Lying".

In 2003, Cagle also performed "Don't Ask Me No Questions" for the Blue Collar Comedy Tour: The Movie soundtrack; it plays during the end credits of the film.

In early 2004, Cagle was diagnosed with multiple anomalies on his vocal cords, including a polyp, a lesion, a vocal fold cyst, and a granuloma. The diagnosis forced him to cancel nearly twenty appearances that year, including opening dates for Rascal Flatts. He was ordered sixty days of vocal rest and did not sing for nearly three months after the diagnosis.

=== 2005–2006: Anywhere but Here ===
After his vocal recovery, Cagle began work on his third studio album, Anywhere but Here, which was released in 2005. "Miss Me Baby" served as the album's first single, reaching No. 12 on the country chart. The other two singles — "Wal-Mart Parking Lot" and the title track, which had also been a single for Brice Long in 2005 – both failed to enter the Top 40.

In August 2006, a Nashville judge ordered Cagle to pay approximately $737,000 to former manager Mark Hybner, whom Chris had sued in 2004 in an effort to void management and publishing deals he had signed in 1999.

=== 2007–2010: My Life's Been a Country Song and The Best of Chris Cagle ===
His eleventh single, "What Kinda Gone", was released to country radio in late 2007. Peaking at No. 3, it was the lead-off single to his fourth studio album My Life's Been a Country Song, which was released on February 19, 2008. The second single from the album, "No Love Songs", was released in May; it debuted and peaked at No. 53 on the Billboard Hot Country Songs chart for the week of May 24, 2008. "Never Ever Gone" did not chart, and Cagle parted ways with Capitol Nashville by year's end. The label released a greatest hits album in 2010 titled The Best of Chris Cagle.

=== 2010–2013: Back in the Saddle ===
In 2010, Cagle signed with the Bigger Picture Music Group. He released a new single, "Got My Country On", on June 28, 2011. The song became Cagle's first top 20 country hit since "What Kinda Gone". His first album for the label, Back in the Saddle, was released on June 26, 2012. The album produced two more singles, "Let There Be Cowgirls" and "Dance Baby Dance", before Bigger Picture Music Group folded in 2013. In October 2015, Cagle announced his retirement from the music industry. He currently lives in Houston, Texas, as of 2020.

== Personal life ==
Cagle graduated from Ross S. Sterling High School in Baytown, Texas, in 1987.

He married school teacher Elizabeth Filer on September 10, 2001, in Houston, Texas, but the marriage ended in divorce in 2003. On October 3, 2005, he announced on his website that he was not the biological father of his then-girlfriend's baby. Cagle is a brother of the Texas Kappa chapter of Phi Delta Theta.

In 2008, Cagle and his girlfriend, Jennifer Tant, were jailed following a domestic assault issue for which Cagle was arrested in November 2007.

In December 2010, Cagle married his second wife, Kay, and became a stepfather to Khloe, her daughter from a previous marriage. Cagle has two biological daughters with Kay; Stella (b. 2010) and Piper (b. 2011).

On December 15, 2013, he was arrested in Greenville, Texas, on "suspicion of driving while intoxicated."

== Discography ==
Studio albums

- Play It Loud (2000)
- Chris Cagle (2003)
- Anywhere but Here (2005)
- My Life's Been a Country Song (2008)
- Back in the Saddle (2012)

== Awards and nominations ==
Year	Organization	Award	Nominee/Work	Result
2002	Academy of Country Music Awards	Top New Male Vocalist	Chris Cagle	Nominated
2002	CMT Flameworthy Awards	Breakthrough Video of the Year	"I Breathe In, I Breathe Out"	Won
2002	CMT Flameworthy Awards	Hottest Video of the Year	"I Breathe In, I Breathe Out"	Nominated
