= Stare (indie band) =

English indie band

- Origin: Norfolk, England
- Genres: Indie, Twee pop
- Years active: 1991–1993
- Labels: Fusebox Records; Big Life Records
- Past members: Michael Brown; David Donley; Karl Goodbody; Richard Hammerton; Derek O'Sullivan/ Paul Youngs

Stare were an early 1990s four-piece indie band from Norfolk, England. Members of the band were Michael Brown, Karl Goodbody, Richard Hammerton and Derek O'Sullivan, joined by second guitarist in March 1992 David Donley.

They released three EPs entitled Stare, Mood and Work between 1991 and 1992 on the Fusebox and Big Life record labels and split in 1993.

Stare were broadcast live, as part of BBC Radio 1's Sound City at the Norwich Waterfront in Norwich, on 26 April 1992, and were on the nights bill with Carter USM, Nick Cave, The Farm and Catherine Wheel.

The band reformed in 2011. Their album The Luxury of Anger, recorded in 1992, was released for the first time in May 2012 on Eastzone Records.
