= Chorditis =

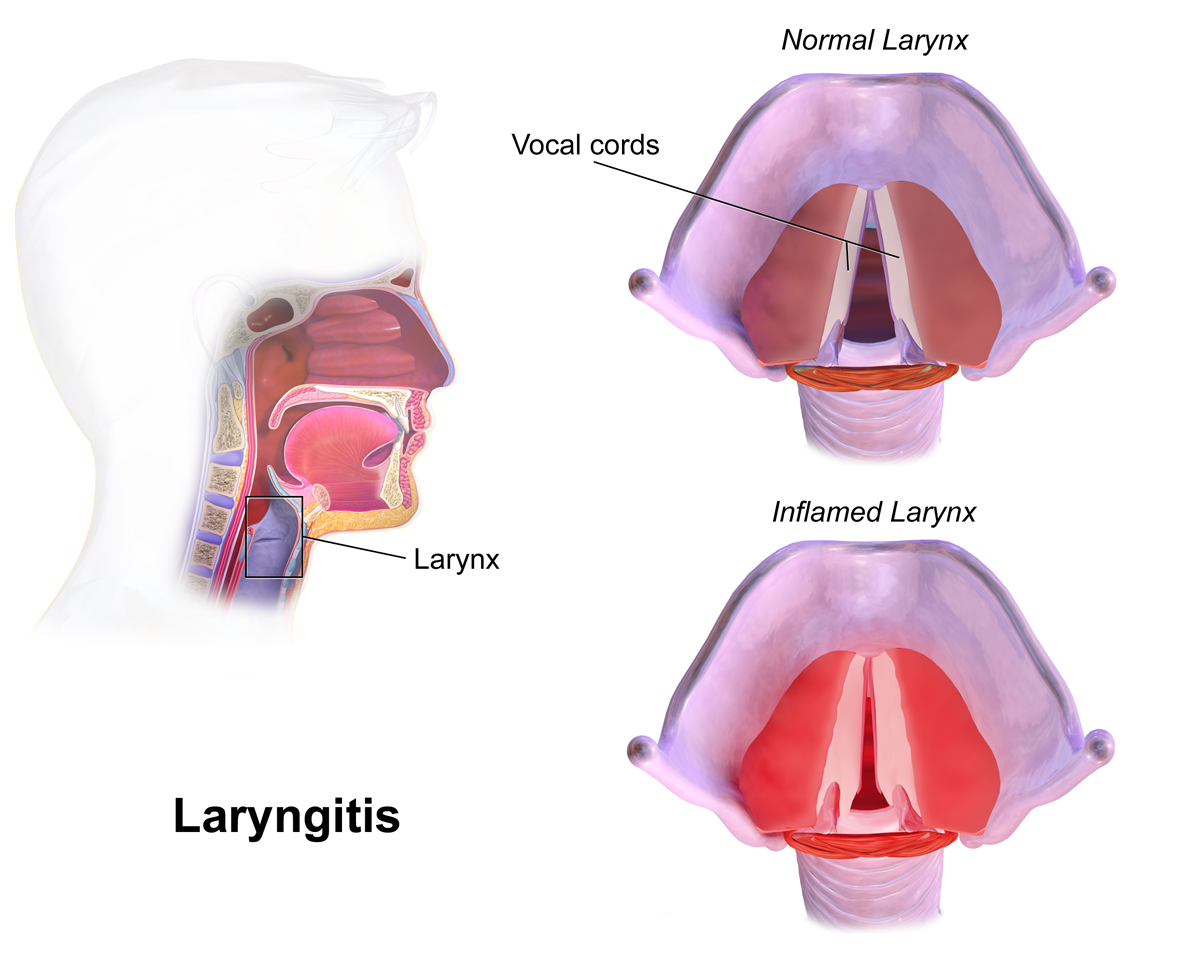
- Laryngitis
- Specialty: Pulmonology

Chorditis is the inflammation of vocal cords (vocal folds) usually as a result of voice abuse but sometimes because of cancer.

== Types ==
- Chorditis fibrinosa
- Chorditis nodosa
- Chorditis tuberosa

== See also ==
- Vocal fold nodule
