= Vocal cord nodule =

Benign white growths on vocal folds which change one's voice quality

Vocal voice nodule
- Other names: Vocal fold nodules, Vocal nodules
- Specialty: Otorhinolaryngology

Vocal cord nodules are bilaterally symmetrical benign white masses (nodules) that form at the midpoint of the vocal folds. Although diagnosis involves a physical examination of the head and neck, as well as perceptual voice measures, visualization of the vocal nodules via laryngeal endoscopy remains the primary diagnostic method.

Vocal fold nodules interfere with the vibratory characteristics of the vocal folds by increasing the mass of the vocal folds and changing the configuration of the vocal fold closure pattern. Due to these changes, the quality of the voice may be affected. As such, the major perceptual signs of vocal fold nodules include vocal hoarseness and breathiness. Other common symptoms include vocal fatigue, soreness or pain lateral to the larynx, and reduced frequency and intensity range. Airflow levels during speech may also be increased. Vocal fold nodules are thought to be the result of vocal fold tissue trauma caused by excessive mechanical stress, including repeated or chronic vocal overuse, abuse, or misuse. Predisposing factors include profession, gender, dehydration, respiratory infection, and other inflammatory factors.

For professional voice users as well as individuals who frequently experience hoarseness, vocal hygiene practices are recommended for the prevention of vocal fold nodules and other voice disorders. Vocal hygiene practices include three components: regulating the quantity and quality of voice use, improving vocal fold hydration, and reducing behaviours that jeopardize vocal health. About 10% of nodules resolve on their own, which is more likely if they are smaller and the onset more recent. Treatment of vocal fold nodules usually involves behavioural intervention therapy administered by a speech–language pathologist. In severe cases, surgery to remove the lesions is recommended for best prognosis. In children, vocal fold nodules are more common in males; in adults, they are more common in females.

== Signs and symptoms ==
One of the major perceptual signs of vocal fold nodules is a change in the quality of the voice. The voice may be perceived as hoarse, due to aperiodic vibrations of the vocal folds, and may also be perceived as breathy, due to an incomplete closure of the vocal folds upon phonation. The degree of hoarseness and breathiness perceived may vary in severity. This variability may be due to the size and firmness of the nodules. Other common symptoms include difficulty producing vocal pitches in the higher range, increased phonatory effort, and vocal fatigue. There may be a sensation of soreness or pain in the neck, lateral to the larynx, which generally occurs because of the increased effort needed to produce the voice.

=== Acoustic signs ===
Major acoustic signs of vocal fold nodules involve changes in the frequency and the intensity of the voice. The fundamental frequency, an acoustic measure of voice pitch, may be normal. However, the range of pitches the individual is capable of producing may be reduced, and it may be especially difficult to produce pitches in the higher range. The intensity of the voice, an acoustic measure of amplitude or loudness, may also be normal. However, the individual's amplitude range may be reduced as well. Perturbations or variations in frequency, known as jitter, and in amplitude, known as shimmer, may be increased.

=== Aerodynamic signs ===
If the nodules affect the closure of the vocal folds, airflow levels during speech may be increased in comparison to the speaker's habitual levels. However, airflow levels may still fall within the upper limits of the normal range. The degree to which an individual's airflow levels increase seems to depend on the severity of the injury. Subglottal pressure, the air pressure that is available below the glottis and in the trachea to produce speech, may be increased as well.

== Causes ==
Vocal fold nodules are thought to be the result of vocal fold tissue trauma caused by excessive mechanical stress. During phonation, the vocal folds undergo many forms of mechanical stress. One example of such stress is the impact stress caused by the collision between the left and right vocal fold surfaces during vibration. This stress is thought to reach its maximum in the mid-membranous region of the vocal folds, at the junction of the anterior 1/3rd and posterior 2/3rd, the most common site of nodule formation. Vocal overuse (speaking for long periods), abuse (yelling), or misuse (hyperfunction) may produce excessive amounts of mechanical stress by increasing the rate and/or force with which the vocal folds collide. This may lead to trauma that is focalized to the mid-membranous vocal fold and subsequent wound formation. Repeated or chronic mechanical stress is thought to lead to the remodeling of the superficial layer of the lamina propria. It is this process of tissue remodeling that results in the formation of benign lesions of the vocal folds such as nodules.

There are several factors that may predispose an individual to vocal fold nodules. Activities or professions that may contribute to phonotraumatic behaviors include cheerleading, untrained singing, speaking above noise, and teaching without voice amplification, as these increase mechanical stress and subsequent vocal fold trauma. Gender may be another predisposing factor, as vocal fold nodules occur more frequently in females. The presence of dehydration, respiratory infection, and inflammatory factors may also act as predisposing or aggravating factors. Inflammatory factors may include allergies, tobacco and alcohol use, laryngopharyngeal reflux, and other environmental influences.

== Pathophysiology ==
Vocal fold nodules often alter the mechanical properties of the vocal folds, which can interfere with their vibratory characteristics. Nodules may increase the mass of the vocal folds, especially along the medial edge where they are typically found. This increased mass may result in aperiodic or irregular vibration, the perception of greater pitch and loudness perturbations, and of increased hoarseness. Nodules may also affect the mucosal wave of the vocal folds by changing the configuration of the vocal fold closure pattern. They often cause incomplete closure of the vocal folds, resulting in an hourglass configuration. The incomplete closure allows more air to escape through the vocal folds, which often results in the perception of breathiness. The degree to which nodules will affect the mucosal wave and vibratory characteristics of the vocal folds depends highly on the size of the nodule. Smaller nodules may still allow the vocal folds to achieve complete closure.

== Diagnosis ==
Diagnosing vocal fold nodules typically includes a comprehensive analysis of medical and voice history, a physical examination of the head and neck, perceptual evaluation of voice, and visualization of the vocal folds. Visualization is considered to be the main method of diagnosis as perceptual evaluation, which includes acoustic and aerodynamic measures, alone is insufficient. Laryngeal videostroboscopy, an imaging technique, is commonly used to view the vocal folds: this procedure can be performed nasally or orally. Vocal fold nodules are most often characterized as bilaterally symmetrical whitish masses, and tend to form at the midpoint of the vocal folds.

Nodules may prevent complete closure of the glottis, also known as glottal closure, and their presence may lead to an hourglass-shaped glottal closure. Voice problems may result from the presence of vocal fold nodules. They are diagnosed based on the presence of perceptual features not explicable by other causes. Such symptoms include: vocal fatigue, breathiness, loss of high pitch notes, lack of vocal control, or increased phonatory effort (i.e. increased effort to produce speech).

== Prevention ==
=== Regulating voice use ===
For individuals who work with their voice (e.g., singers, actors, teachers, stock brokers), voice training that includes vocal function exercises (VFEs) may help reduce undue vocal strain. Furthermore, recommendations for voice professionals include warm-up and cool-down exercises for the voice to reduce strain. Additionally, using amplification devices, such as speakers or microphones, is recommended for individuals who speak to large, and even small groups or in the presence of background noise.

=== Hydration ===
Staying hydrated decreases the pressure that the vocal folds exert on one another by ensuring sufficient lubrication by mucosa, increasing the efficiency of vocal fold oscillation during speech, and promoting a healthy voice quality. Consumption of caffeine in large quantities is dehydrating and is therefore implicated in an increased risk of vocal fold nodules.

=== Lifestyle changes ===
Behaviours such as frequent throat clearing, shouting, speaking over background noise, and hard crying are associated with an increased risk of developing nodules and other vocal pathologies. Furthermore, unconventional voice practices such as speaking in the falsetto register, cause excessive strain and may result in nodules. The avoidance of damaging vocal behaviours may prevent the formation of nodules. Tobacco, alcohol, certain medications, and recreational drugs have also been implicated in pathologies of the vocal folds. Reducing exposure to these substances has been shown to reduce one's risk of nodules. Other behaviours that are implicated in vocal fold nodules include poor sleeping habits and poor nutrition.

== Treatment ==
The two main methods of treating vocal fold nodules are voice therapy (a behavioural treatment) and laryngeal microsurgery (a surgical treatment). Because of general risks of surgery (e.g. scar formation, or those posed by general anesthesia), behavioural treatment is usually recommended first.

=== Behavioural treatment ===
Behavioural voice therapy is typically carried out by speech–language pathologists. While behavioural treatments methods vary greatly, they are generally effective at improving vocal quality and decreasing size of vocal fold nodules. Complete resolution of nodules through behavioural treatment is possible but unlikely.

Behavioural techniques can be indirect or direct. Indirect approaches focus on improving vocal hygiene, introducing and/or maintaining safe voice practices (thereby reducing opportunities for phonotrauma) and, occasionally, implementing vocal rest. Direct approaches involve reducing the physiological strain on the vocal system while the voice is being used (e.g. during speaking or singing), such as by reducing collision forces between the vocal folds, ensuring sufficient pulmonary support while speaking (e.g. by changing the individual's breathing pattern), and optimizing resonance of the larynx and other structures of the vocal apparatus.

Behavioural treatments also vary in delivery model. Traditional therapy distribution (e.g. eight sessions within eight weeks), more intensive approaches (e.g. eight session within three weeks) and remote therapy (i.e. telehealth) have all shown effectiveness in treating vocal fold nodules.

Assessment of outcomes of behavioural treatments also varies greatly. Effects can be measured visually (e.g. by the same methods typically used to confirm the presence of vocal fold nodules: video endoscopy and video stroboscopy), aerodynamically (e.g. by measuring parameters such as transglottal pressure and the glottal airflow waveform), perceptually (e.g. by rating the voice in terms of dimensions such as roughness, breathiness, asthenia and strain), in terms of effect on quality of life measures, or using any combination of the above.

Finally, recurrence of vocal fold nodules after behavioural treatment is always a possibility, particularly if nodules were not completely resolved or if skills gained during treatment were not carried-over outside of therapy sessions or maintained after therapy blocks.

=== Surgery ===
When behavioural treatments have been deemed ineffective for a voice user, surgical intervention is often considered. Surgical treatments are considered in cases of unresolved dysphonia which negatively impacts the patient's quality of life. Removal of vocal fold nodules is a relatively safe and minor surgery. However, those who sing professionally or otherwise should take serious consideration before having surgery as it can affect the ability to sustain phonation, as well as alter the vocal range. While the patient is subdued under general anesthesia, long thin scissors and scalpels or CO_{2} surgical lasers might be used to remove the nodules. Microsutures are sometimes used to close the incision. Vocal rest for a period of 4 to 14 days is recommended post surgery to facilitate healing.

== Prognosis ==
Vocal fold nodules typically respond well to non-surgical/behavioural treatment techniques such as those described in the "Treatment" section. Therefore, if the patient is able to engage in such behaviour modification techniques the prognosis is good (although exact data is not available). If lesions are still present after non-surgical treatment methods, it is likely they are another form of benign vocal fold lesion (polyp, fibrous mass, cyst, or pseudocyst). The prognosis of requiring surgery would only occur after an exhaustive attempt at non-surgical therapy techniques has been applied.

== Epidemiology ==
Research on the epidemiology of vocal fold nodules in children has suggested that nodules are more common in boys (2:1), in particular boys who are active and scream more frequently. However, in adulthood, women are more likely to have nodules, and are especially likely if they have an outgoing personality or sing frequently. The exact prevalence of vocal fold nodules is not known, but it has been reported that 23.4% of children who attended an ENT clinic for voice hoarseness, 6% of phoniatric clinic attendees, and 43% of teachers with dysphonia had nodules.
