= Since You've Been Gone (album) =

Studio album by Damage
- Released: 2 April 2001
- Length: 57:10
- Label: Cooltempo; EMI
- Producer: Steve Mac; Tim & Bob

Damage chronology
Forever (1997)	Since You've Been Gone (2001)	Acoustically Yours (2014)

Singles from Since You've Been Gone
- 1. "Ghetto Romance" Released: 29 May 2000; 2. "Rumours" Released: 16 October 2000; 3. "Still Be Lovin' You" Released: 19 March 2001; 4. "So What If I" Released: 2 July 2001; 5. "After the Love Has Gone" Released: 3 December 2001

Since You've Been Gone is the second and final studio album by British boy band Damage, released on 2 April 2001, two weeks after the release of the album's third single. The album was the last album to be released under the band's original tenure and the last to feature original band member Coreé Richards. The album features a number of guest vocalists, including Kele Le Roc and band member Jade Jones' long-term partner Emma Bunton. The British release contains an additional remix of "So What If I". The album contains the band's signature single "Ghetto Romance" produced and written by producers Tim & Bob, as well as "Rumours", "Still Be Lovin' You" and "After the Love Has Gone".

== Background ==
The album was initially due for release on 25 September 2000, following the release of "Rumours". However, the release date was subsequently pushed back to allow for new material to be recorded. This resulted in the album's track listing being revised. The initial track listing includes the tracks "Feelin' Me" and "Midnight Caller", as well as an outro called "Before We Leave". However, the final release omits these three tracks and instead replaces them with "I Don't Know" (featuring Emma Bunton), "After the Love Has Gone" and a Mushtaq mix of "So What If I". A "Lovestruck Garage Mix" of "Midnight Caller" was released as the B-side to "Ghetto Romance", while "Feelin' Me" was released as the B-side to "Rumours". "I Don't Know" had previously been released as the B-side to "Still Be Lovin' You", while "After the Love Has Gone" was subsequently released as a single in its own right. "Before We Leave" and the original, full version of "Midnight Caller" remain unreleased commercially.

== Track listing ==
Since You've Been Gone track listing
No.	Title	Writer(s)	Producer(s)	Length
1.	"The Journey"	Coreé Richards; Noel Simpson; Jade Jones; Andrez Harriott; Rahsaan J Bromfield	Damage	1:55
2.	"Ghetto Romance" (featuring Siamese)	Tim Kelley; Bob Robinson; Joe Thomas; Joshua Thompson	Tim & Bob	4:06
3.	"I Don't Know" (featuring Emma Bunton)	Mushtaq; Michelle Escoffery	Mushtaq	4:27
4.	"You're So Fly" (featuring JP)	Ignorants; Wayne Hector	Trell and Marshall; Hector^{[a]}; Damage^{[a]}	3:52
5.	"Better Than"	Zeke Lewis; Jamie Jazz; John "Jubu" Smith	Charles Farrar; Troy Taylor	4:47
6.	"Still Be Lovin' You"	Gordon Chambers; David "Jam" Hall	Hall; The Millionaires^{[b]}	3:51
7.	"After the Love Has Gone"	David Foster; Jay Graydon; Bill Champlin	D'Influence	4:35
8.	"Sure Nuff"	Richards; Simpson; Jones; Harriott; Bromfield; Carl West; Ira Shickman; Rahsaan Patterson	Shickman	4:42
9.	"For Your Pleasure"	Andrew Smith; Femi Williams; Mark "Filo" Anthoni	Femi; Filo; The Millionaires^{[b]}	4:20
10.	"Good Folk"	Richards; Simpson; Jones; Harriott; Bromfield; Mushtaq	Mushtaq; Dodge^{[b]}; Damage^{[a]}	4:12
11.	"Tune"	Richards; Simpson; Jones; Harriott; Bromfield	Damage	1:04
12.	"Rumours"	Richards; Simpson; Jones; Harriott; Bromfield; Johnny Douglas	Karl "K-Gee" Gordon; Steve Octave	4:02
13.	"Maria" (featuring Kele Le Roc)	Richards; Simpson; Jones; Harriott; Bromfield; Mushtaq	Mushtaq	5:45
14.	"Tears"	Richards; Simpson; Jones; Harriott; Bromfield; Marcus Johnson; Marwenna Diame	Tim & Bob	4:47
15.	"So What If I"	Steve Mac; Wayne Hector	Mac; Hector	3:14
16.	"Since You've Been Gone"	Alan Ross; C. Outen; Roger Russell	Mushtaq; Dodge^{[b]}	4:31
17.	"So What If I" (Mushtaq Mix featuring Iceberg Slimm)	Mac; Hector; Mushtaq; Slimm	Mac; Hector; Mushtaq^{[b]}	3:54
Total length:				57:10

Original track listing
No.	Title	Length
1.	"The Journey"
2.	"Ghetto Romance" (featuring Siamese)
3.	"You're So Fly" (featuring JP)
4.	"Better Than"
5.	"Still Be Lovin' You" (original version)
6.	"Rumours"
7.	"Good Folk"
8.	"Feelin' Me" (featuring Iceberg Slimm)
9.	"For Your Pleasure"
10.	"Sure Nuff"
11.	"Maria" (featuring Kele Le Roc)
12.	"Tune"
13.	"Midnight Caller"
14.	"Tears"
15.	"So What If I"
16.	"Since You've Been Gone"
17.	"Before We Leave..."

Notes

- ^{^[a]} signifies vocal producer(s)
- ^{^[b]} signifies additional producer(s)

== Charts ==
=== Weekly charts ===
Weekly chart performance for Since You've Been Gone
Chart (2001)	Peak position
European Albums Chart	77
Scottish Albums (OCC)	55
UK Albums (OCC)	16

=== Year-end charts ===
Year-end chart performance for Since You've Been Gone
Chart (2001)	Peak position
UK Albums (OCC)	183

== Certifications ==
Certifications for Since You've Been Gone
Region	Certification	Certified units/sales
United Kingdom (BPI)	Gold	100,000^{^}
^{^} Shipments figures based on certification alone.
