= Forever (Damage song) =

Single by Damage

from the album Forever
- B-side: "They Don't Have to Know"
- Released: 7 December 1996
- Genre: R&B
- Length: 4:39
- Label: Big Life
- Songwriters: Steve Mac; Wayne Hector; Ali Tennant
- Producer: Steve Mac

Damage singles chronology
| "Love II Love" (1996) | "Forever" (1996) | "Love Guaranteed" (1997) |

"Forever" is a song by British boy band Damage, released on 7 December 1996 as the third single from their debut album of the same name. The song was a major success on the UK Singles Chart as it made the top 10, peaking at No. 6. In Australia, the song peaked at No. 13 in 1997, becoming the group's most successful release in the region.

The song was covered by Irish boy band Westlife in 1999, as a B-side to their debut single "Swear It Again".

== Music video ==
The music video is set against a CGI landscape, set in the clouds. The band appear in a range of oversized jackets, performing the song.

== Track listings ==
CD1

1. "Forever" (radio edit) - 4:39
2. "They Don't Have to Know" (H. Atkins/K. Atkins/Trotman/Simpson/Harriott, produced by Ethnic Boyz)
3. "Forever" (Linslee Campbell mix) - 5:39
4. "Damage Groove" (Simpson/Jones/Bromfield/Richards/Harriott, produced by Mark Lewis)

CD2

1. "Forever" (original mix) - 5:00
2. "My Heart Cries" (Simpson/Jones/Bromfield/Richards/Harriott, produced by Mark Lewis) - 5:18
3. "Private Thoughts" (a personal message from Damage)

Cassette

1. "Forever" (radio edit) - 4:39
2. "They Don't Have to Know"
3. "Private Thoughts" (a personal message from Damage)

12-inch vinyl

1. "Forever" (radio edit) - 4:39
2. "They Don't Have to Know"
3. "Be My Baby" (Terri Robinson, Dominic Owen, Fabian Hamilton, produced by High Class)

== Charts ==
=== Weekly charts ===
| Chart (1996–97) | Peak position |
|---|---|
| Australia (ARIA) | 13 |
| Europe (Eurochart Hot 100) | 45 |
| France Airplay (SNEP) | 100 |
| Ireland (IRMA) | 21 |
| UK Singles (OCC) | 6 |
| UK Airplay (Music Week) | 19 |
| UK Indie (Music Week) | 1 |
| UK Hip Hop/R&B (OCC) | 1 |

=== Year-end charts ===
| Chart (1996) | Position |
|---|---|
| UK Singles (OCC) | 98 |
| Chart (1997) | Position |
| Australia (ARIA) | 99 |
