= David Kersh =

American country music singer (born 1970)

- Born: Charles David Kersh; December 9, 1970 (age 55)
- Origin: Humble, Texas, U.S.
- Genres: Country
- Occupation: Singer
- Instruments: Vocals, guitar
- Years active: 1996–2005
- Label: Curb
- Spouse: Kerry Kersh (m. 2009)

Charles David Kersh (born December 9, 1970) is an American country music singer who made his debut in 1996. His first album, Goodnight Sweetheart, was released that year, producing four singles on the Billboard Hot Country Singles & Tracks charts. A second album, titled If I Never Stop Loving You, was released a year later, producing three additional chart singles. Kersh retired from the music business in 2005.

== Biography ==
=== Early life ===
Kersh graduated in 1989 from Humble High School near Houston.

Prior to becoming a musician, David Kersh worked in various endeavors in the field of sanitation. Kersh got his musical start in his early twenties, while working at various dance halls throughout the state of Texas including being the lead singer for the house band at Dance Across Texas in Austin.

=== Music career ===
Curb Records signed Kersh in 1996, and his debut album, Goodnight Sweetheart, was released the same year, with its title track peaking at No. 6 on the Billboard Hot Country Singles & Tracks chart. The album also featured the No. 3 single "Another You" (which was written by a then-unknown Brad Paisley) and the No. 11 "Day In, Day Out".

In 1998, Kersh's second album was released. If I Never Stop Loving You was the name of both the album and its lead-off single, which was also a No. 3. The album also featured "I Breathe In, I Breathe Out", co-written by Chris Cagle; although Kersh's version of the song was never issued as a single, Cagle would later cut the song himself and take it to Number One on the country music charts in early 2002. "If I Never Stop Loving You" was followed by a No. 29-peaking cover of Eric Clapton's "Wonderful Tonight", and the No. 46 "Something to Think About".

In 1999, Kersh received a nomination by the Academy of Country Music Awards for Top New Male Vocalist of the Year, alongside Deryl Dodd and Mark Wills, losing to Wills. He also posed shirtless in Playgirl magazine. Later that year, he was forced to put his career on hold due to strain on his vocal cords.

=== Leaving music ===
By 2005, Kersh had announced that he was leaving the country music scene. On his website, Kersh wrote a letter to his fans, explaining that his "heart is just not in the music business anymore".

On May 23, 2009, Kersh married singer Kerry Harvick in Comanche in Central Texas, where the couple still resides and where he works as a real estate agent.

== Discography ==
=== Albums ===
Title	Album details	Peak chart positions		
Title	Album details	US Country	US	US Heat
Goodnight Sweetheart	Release date: October 1, 1996; Label: Curb Records	21	169	7
If I Never Stop Loving You	Release date: February 17, 1998; Label: Curb Records	13	134	4

=== Singles ===
Year	Single	Peak chart positions			Album
Year	Single	US Country	US	CAN Country	Album
1996	"Breaking Hearts and Taking Names"	65	—	—	Goodnight Sweetheart
1996	"Goodnight Sweetheart"	6	113	44	Goodnight Sweetheart
1997	"Another You"	3	—	14	Goodnight Sweetheart
1997	"Day In, Day Out"	11	—	12	Goodnight Sweetheart
1997	"If I Never Stop Loving You"	3	67	10	If I Never Stop Loving You
1998	"Wonderful Tonight"	29	—	45	If I Never Stop Loving You
1998	"Something to Think About"	46	—	57	If I Never Stop Loving You
"—" denotes releases that did not chart

=== Music videos ===
Year	Video	Director
1996	"Goodnight Sweetheart"	Chris Rogers
1997	"If I Never Stop Loving You"	David Abbott
1998	"Wonderful Tonight"	David Abbott

== Awards and nominations ==
Year	Organization	Award	Nominee/Work	Result
1999	Academy of Country Music Awards	Top New Male Vocalist	David Kersh	Nominated
