= If I Never Stop Loving You (song) =

Single by David Kersh

from the album If I Never Stop Loving You
- B-side: "The Need"
- Released: December 1, 1997
- Recorded: 1997
- Genre: Country
- Length: 3:35
- Label: Curb
- Songwriters: Skip Ewing, Donny Kees
- Producer: Pat McMakin

David Kersh singles chronology
"Day In, Day Out" (1997)	"If I Never Stop Loving You" (1997)	"Wonderful Tonight" (1998)

"If I Never Stop Loving You" is a song written by Skip Ewing and Donny Kees, and recorded by American country music artist David Kersh. It was released in December 1997 as the lead-off single and title track from the album If I Never Stop Loving You. The song reached number 3 on the Billboard Hot Country Singles & Tracks chart and number 10 on the Canadian RPM Country Tracks chart, his most successful single on that chart. It was Kersh's last top ten hit.

== Music video ==
The music video was directed by David Abbott and premiered in November 1997.

== Chart performance ==
"If I Never Stop Loving You" debuted at number 72 on the U.S. Billboard Hot Country Singles & Tracks for the week of December 6, 1997.

Chart (1997–1998)	Peak position
Canada Country Singles (RPM)	10
US Billboard Hot 100	67
US Hot Country Songs (Billboard)	3

=== Year-end charts ===
Chart (1998)	Position
Canada Country Tracks (RPM)	74
US Country Songs (Billboard)	18
