= Let There Be Cowgirls =

Single by Chris Cagle

from the album Back in the Saddle
- Released: July 2, 2012
- Genre: Country
- Length: 4:33
- Label: Bigger Picture Music Group
- Songwriter: Chris Cagle; Kim Tribble
- Producer: Keith Stegall

Chris Cagle singles chronology
"Got My Country On" (2011)	"Let There Be Cowgirls" (2012)	"Dance Baby Dance" (2013)

"Let There Be Cowgirls" is a song co-written and recorded by American country music artist Chris Cagle. It was released in July 2012 as the second single from his album Back in the Saddle. The song was written by Cagle and Kim Tribble.

== Background ==
Cagle said, "This is a ‘Tah-Dah!’ song; we got lucky, it wrote itself, I’m surrounded by beauty at the ranch and ‘my cowgirls’ are part of the art; I have a genuine appreciation. ‘Cowgirls’ is already a fan favorite at our shows." Cagle said the song is inspired by his wife Kay.

== Critical reception ==
Ben Foster of Country Universe gave the album a C rating and described as "“Got My Country On,” Part 2". Allen Jacobs of Roughstock wrote, "It suits Cagle's masculine persona as well as his bigger rockin' hits have and with radio and fans reminded of who he is, it has the road laid-out for at least another Top 20, perhaps Top 10 success. Daryl Addison of GAC wrote the song "features some superbly swamp-filled resonator and B-3 organ to round out the hard-country production."

== Chart performance ==
"Let There Be Cowgirls" debuted at number 56 on the U.S. Billboard Hot Country Songs chart for the week of July 14, 2012. It also debuted at number 97 on the U.S. Billboard Hot 100 chart for the week of February 9, 2013.

Chart (2012–2013)	Peak position
US Billboard Hot 100	96
US Country Airplay (Billboard)	16
US Hot Country Songs (Billboard)	26

=== Year-end charts ===
Chart (2013)	Position
US Country Airplay (Billboard)	84
US Hot Country Songs (Billboard)	96
