= Back in the Saddle (album) =

Studio album by Chris Cagle
- Released: June 26, 2012
- Recorded: 2011–2012
- Genre: Country
- Length: 44:11
- Label: Bigger Picture Music Group
- Producer: Keith Stegall (all tracks); D. Vincent Williams (tracks 3, 7, 11)

Chris Cagle chronology
The Best of Chris Cagle (2010)	Back in the Saddle (2012)

Singles from Back in the Saddle
- 1. "Got My Country On" Released: August 29, 2011; 2. "Let There Be Cowgirls" Released: July 2, 2012; 3. "Dance Baby Dance" Released: April 15, 2013

Professional ratings
Review scores
Source	Rating
Allmusic	3/5 stars

Back in the Saddle is the fifth and final studio album by American country music artist Chris Cagle. It was released on June 26, 2012 as his only studio album via Bigger Picture Music Group. It includes the Top 15 single "Got My Country On."

== Track listing ==
No.	Title	Writer(s)	Length
1.	"Got My Country On"	Kelly Archer, Danny Myrick, Justin Weaver	3:54
2.	"I'll Grow My Own"	Casey Beathard, Brad Warren, Brett Warren	4:00
3.	"Something That Wild"	Chris Cagle, Kim Tribble	3:37
4.	"Let There Be Cowgirls"	Cagle, Tribble	4:33
5.	"Dance Baby Dance"	Cagle, Brad Warren, Brett Warren	3:30
6.	"When Will My Lover Come Around"	Jim Beavers, Jonathan Singleton	3:14
7.	"Southern Girl"	Cagle, D. Vincent Williams	4:26
8.	"Probably Just Time"	Dennis Matkosky, Melissa Pierce, Singleton	4:03
9.	"Thank God She Left the Whiskey"	Ashe Underwood, Justin Wilson	3:38
10.	"Now I Know What Mama Meant"	Cagle, Clay Mills	4:39
11.	"Just Enough"	Dallas Davidson, Phillip White	4:37

== Personnel ==
- Robert Bailey Jr.- background vocals
- Tom Bukovac- electric guitar
- Chris Cagle- lead vocals
- Chad Cromwell- drums
- Dan Dugmore- dobro, electric guitar, steel guitar, lap steel guitar
- Stuart Duncan- fiddle, acoustic guitar, resonator guitar
- Shannon Forrest- drums
- Paul Franklin- steel guitar
- Vicki Hampton- background vocals
- Wes Hightower- background vocals
- Andy Leftwich- fiddle, mandolin
- Paul Leim- drums
- Brent Mason- electric guitar
- Gary Prim- Hammond B-3 organ, piano, Wurlitzer
- John Wesley Ryles- background vocals
- Jimmie Lee Sloas- bass guitar
- Bobby Terry- acoustic guitar, electric guitar, resonator guitar
- D. Vincent Williams- background vocals
- Glenn Worf- bass guitar

== Charts ==
=== Weekly charts ===
Chart (2012)	Peak position
US Billboard 200	27
US Top Country Albums (Billboard)	6

=== Year-end charts ===
Chart (2012)	Position
US Top Country Albums (Billboard)	71
