= Vocal cord cyst =

Benign masses of the vocal folds

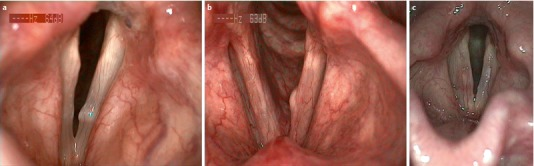
- a) Vocal fold cysts b) Vocal fold cysts with corresponding scars c) Epidermoid cyst

Vocal fold cysts (also known as vocal cord cysts) are benign masses of the membranous vocal folds. These cysts are enclosed, sac-like structures that are typically of a yellow or white colour. They occur unilaterally on the midpoint of the medial edge of the vocal folds. They can also form on the upper/superior surface of the vocal folds. There are two types of vocal fold cysts:

1. Sub-epithelial vocal fold cysts- located in the superficial lamina propria of the vocal folds.
2. Ligament vocal fold cysts- located within the deeper layers of the lamina propria or on the vocal ligament.

The symptoms of vocal fold cysts vary but most commonly include a hoarse voice and problems with the pitch of the voice. Vocal fold cysts are diagnosed based on gathering a case history, perceptual examination, and laryngeal imaging. Practicing good vocal hygiene is recommended to prevent vocal fold cysts. Initial treatment of the cysts involves voice therapy to reduce harmful vocal behaviours. If symptoms remain after voice therapy, patients may require surgery to remove the cyst. Surgery is typically followed by vocal rest and further voice therapy to improve voice function. Cysts may also be treated using vocal fold steroid injection.

== Types ==
Sub-epithelial cysts (also known as mucous retention cysts) are closed lesions that occur from a build-up of tissue on the vocal folds. They are typically found in the middle portion of the upper lamina propria of the vocal folds. Sub-epithelial cysts are small and white in colour. Their presence on the vocal folds usually does not disrupt the vibration of the vocal folds for speech (known as the "mucosal wave").

Ligament cysts (also known as epidermoid cysts) are closed lesions that occur near the vocal ligament in the deep layers of the lamina propria. Ligament cysts are usually larger in size than sub-epithelial cysts. They are yellow in colour and unlike sub-epithelial cysts, their presence is usually observed to disrupt the mucosal wave of the vocal folds in the region around the cyst.

== Signs and symptoms ==
Sub-epithelial vocal fold cysts and ligament vocal fold cysts are characterized by similar symptoms. The presence and severity of symptoms may be influenced by the location and size of the cyst.

Common symptoms include:

- Hoarse voice
- Inability to produce high pitch notes
- Fatigue when speaking
- Limited pitch range
- Pain near the larynx
- Variations in pitch when speaking

Signs and symptoms of vocal fold cysts may remain stable or increase over time. In rare cases it is also possible for symptoms to improve if the cyst ruptures spontaneously. Symptoms affecting quality of voice tend to worsen after speaking for long periods of time, or when speaking with increased volume. Many individuals who use their voice professionally find even a slight presence of symptoms to be problematic. However, some voice professionals are not impacted by the presence of vocal cysts.

== Vocal dynamics ==
Vocal fold cysts cause the properties of the vocal folds to change. When a cyst is present on a vocal fold, the cover of the vocal fold becomes more stiff and increases in mass. The increased mass and stiffness tends to result in hyperkinetic muscular movement during phonation. Hyperkinetic movement is characterized by increased rigidity in the affected vocal fold(s). This hyperkinetic movement results in the voice being perceived as hoarse. (see Signs and Symptoms) Specifically, the presence of a vocal fold cyst leads to an asynchronous mucosal wave of the vocal folds during phonation.

== Causes ==
There are several possible causes of vocal fold cysts:

1. They can be congenital.
2. They can result from the blockage of a mucous gland's excretory duct. In this case, they are sometimes referred to as retention cysts.
3. They can be the result of phonotrauma. Phonotrauma refers to behaviours that can lead to vocal fold injuries, such as vocal overuse (i.e. too much speaking), vocal misuse (i.e. speaking in an unnaturally high or low pitch), or vocal abuse (i.e. yelling or whispering for prolonged periods). Vocal folds vibrate during phonation resulting in repeated collisions of the right and left vocal folds. Phonotrauma subjects the vocal folds to excessive mechanical forces during these vibratory cycles, which can lead to the development of a wound. It is the healing of these wounds, which leads to tissue re-structuring, that can result in a vocal fold cyst.

== Histology ==
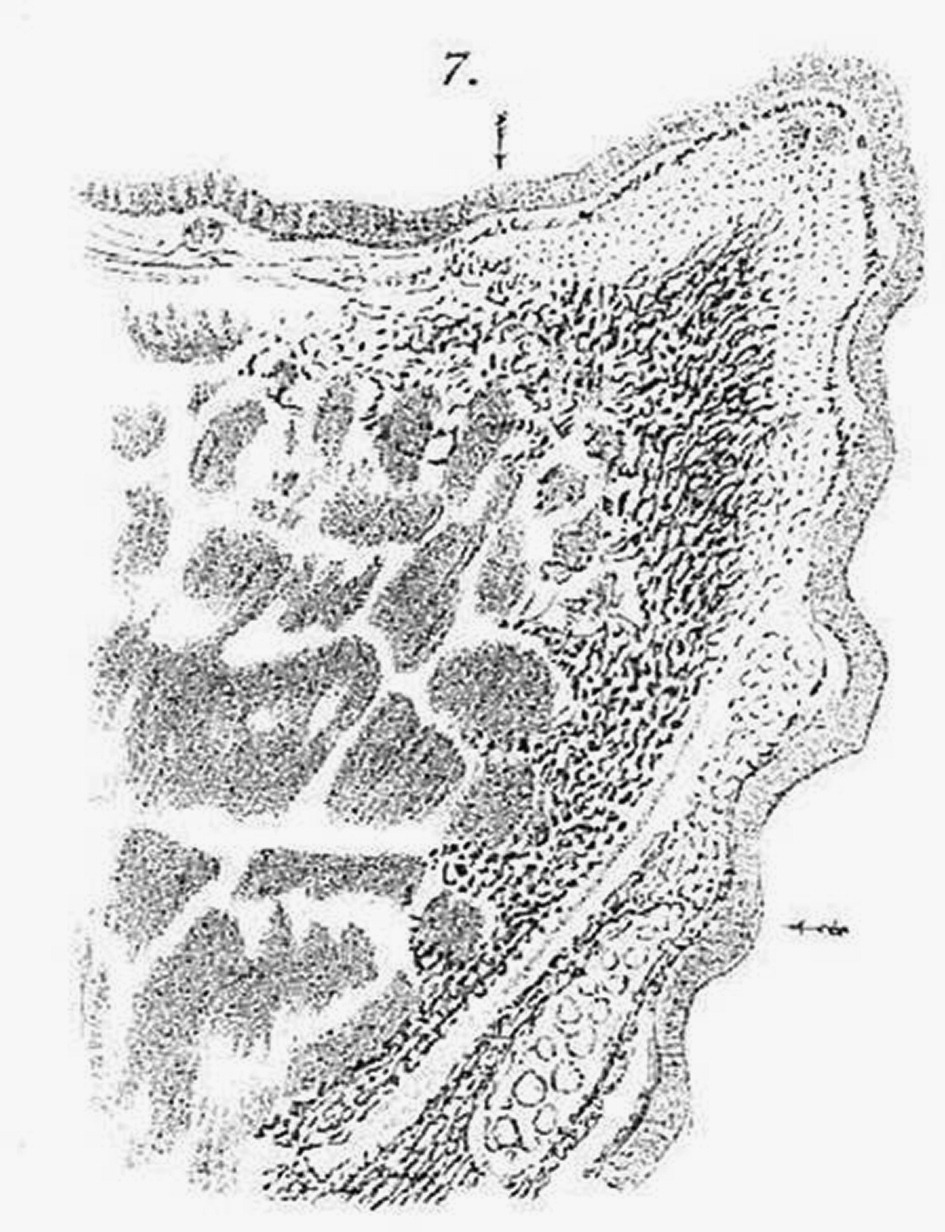
A cross section of the vocal folds showing the different layers

The vocal folds consist of 3 primary layers; the Epithelium, the Lamina Propria (containing superficial, intermediate and deep layers) and the Thyroarytenoid Muscle. Vocal fold cysts commonly appear in the Superficial portion of the Lamina Propria, the cyst size impacts the nature of this layer making it more rigid. The border of vocal fold cysts contains squamous or epithelial cells. In the case of retention cysts, the border consists of glandular epithelium. Epidermoid cysts closely resemble epidermal cysts that can occur anywhere in the body.

== Diagnosis ==
There are generally four components included in the full diagnosis of a vocal cord cyst: a medical and voice history, a head and neck exam, a perceptual assessment of the voice and imaging of the vocal folds. A medical and voice history can help distinguish patterns of misuse and phonotrauma to assist in diagnosis. The primary perceptual sign of vocal fold cysts is hoarseness of the voice. Diagnosis through perceptual means alone is difficult, therefore in the fourth component of diagnosis the patient often undergoes an imaging procedure. Imaging is most commonly done with laryngeal videostroboscopy. A videostroboscopy is an examination of the vocal folds using flashes of light to slow down the image of the vocal fold movement enough to provide a sharp picture of the phases of the movement cycle (mucosal wave.) This procedure provides information about vocal fold vibrations during speech, vocal intensity and vocal frequency. Imaging shows the reduced movement of the vocal folds (mucosal wave) when a vocal fold cyst is present. Further, videostroboscopy tends to show increased submucosal swelling in the affected areas of the vocal fold(s) More recently, other technologies have been introduced to assist with obtaining imaging of the vocal folds, including the use of Narrow-band imaging (NBI.) Narrow-band imaging involves the use of blue and yellow lights to improve the picture quality of an image and accentuate blood vessel visibility. NBI has been found to help improve visual identification of vocal fold cysts in some cases.

Vocal fold cysts can be differentiated from other vocal fold growths as they are usually unilateral. The two types of vocal fold cysts (sub-epithelial and ligament cysts) can be differentiated by colour, size and location.

If the vocal fold cyst(s) are presumed to be congenital, the patient should have a history of presenting with a hoarse voice.Patients with vocal fold cysts are considered for surgery when presenting with:

- Dysphonia
- Lack of improvement through voice therapy

== Prevention ==
A key aspect of preventing vocal fold cysts is good vocal hygiene. Good vocal hygiene promotes the healthy use of the vocal apparatus and the avoidance of phonotrauma. Good vocal hygiene practices involve the avoidance of:

- Shouting
- Whispering loudly or for long periods of time
- Frequently of talking over loud background noise
- Talking while yawning
- Continual clearing of the throat
- Speaking in an unnatural voice (i.e. too high or low)
- Talking with a cold or laryngitis
- Smoking tobacco or marijuana
- The consumption of alcohol and coffee
- The use of antihistamines, aspirin, steroids, tricyclic antidepressants, or any substance that alters perception (i.e. sleeping pills)
- Foul air

In addition, good vocal hygiene involves getting enough rest and drinking sufficient water. It is important to keep the vocal fold tissue healthy and hydrated, and when possible to limit the quantity of speaking in order to avoid damage.

== Treatment ==
Vocal fold cysts are treated using a multidisciplinary approach. Vocal fold cysts are most responsive when surgical intervention is supplemented with voice therapy. Applying vocal therapy techniques in isolation has not yet been proven to remediate and decrease the actual size of the vocal fold cyst.

Voice therapy to address harmful vocal behaviours is recommended as the first treatment option. Voice therapy may involve reducing tension in the larynx, reducing loudness, reducing the amount of speech produced, and modifying the environment. If symptoms are significant, treatment usually involves microsurgery to remove the cyst. Although voice therapy is useful for preventing vocal fold cysts caused by phonotrauma and for promoting safe vocal practices, vocal fold cysts tend not to respond to therapy alone and typically require surgery for full repair.

During surgery, attempts are made to preserve as much vocal fold tissue as possible, given that glottal insufficiency (a gap in the vocal folds) is a possible consequence of surgery. Vocal fold tissue can be preserved during surgery by raising a micro-flap, removing the cyst, then laying the flap back down. This is intended to lead to minimal scarring and improved voice function. However, if any epithelium from the cyst sac is left behind during surgery, the cyst may regrow. Surgery of the larynx may also be conducted using a CO_{2} laser, which was reported as early as the 1970s. Congenital ductal cysts (those caused by blockage of a glandular duct) may be treated by marsupialization.

Following surgery, patients are recommended to take 2 to 14 days of vocal rest. In absolute vocal rest, activities such as talking, whispering, whistling, straining, coughing, and sneezing are restricted. Once adequate healing has occurred, the patient may be transitioned to relative vocal rest, which typically involves 5 to 10 minutes of breathy voicing per hour. Voice therapy is then required to restore as much function as possible. Post-operative voice therapy may include addressing harmful vocal behaviours, exercises to restrengthen the larynx, and reintegration into normal voice activities.

Professional voice users who do not experience substantial limitations due to their cysts may choose to forego surgery. Considering that some cysts remain stable over long periods of time, voice therapy alone may be an option for those who are resistant to surgery. Another option for those who are unwilling to undergo surgery is vocal fold steroid injection (VFSI). Injection of the vocal folds may be done transorally or percutaneously, through the thyrohyoid membrane, thyroid cartilage, or cricothyroid membrane. After VFSI, patients are recommended to take 1 to 7 days of vocal rest. VFSI may also be used to delay surgery, or as a treatment method when the risks associated with surgery are deemed to be too high.

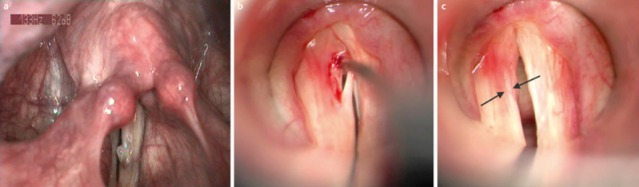
Vocal Fold Cyst and mucosal bridge after dissection

== Prognosis ==
Following diagnosis, voice therapy should be implemented to optimize vocal hygiene. Vocal fold cysts tend not to improve solely through vocal rest or vocal therapy.Patients with sub-epithelial cysts have a better prognosis for timely recovery of vocal abilities than patients with ligament vocal fold cysts. Typically, patients can resume speaking activities in 7–30 days following surgery, and singing activities 30–90 days post-surgery.

Up to 20% of patients show scarring, polyps or vascular changes of the vocal folds following surgery. In severe cases, these resulting symptoms may require further surgery. The patient must always be aware of the impact and potential complications of surgery on their voice, especially if the voice is heavily used occupationally. In these cases, post-operative therapy should be discussed.

== See also ==
- Vocal fold nodule
