= Anywhere but Here (Chris Cagle album) =

Studio album by Chris Cagle
- Released: October 4, 2005
- Genre: Country
- Length: 48:20
- Label: Capitol Nashville
- Producers: Chris Cagle; Robert Wright

Chris Cagle chronology
| Chris Cagle (2003) | Anywhere but Here (2005) | My Life's Been a Country Song (2008) |

Singles from Anywhere but Here
- 1. "Miss Me Baby" Released: June 13, 2005; 2. "Wal-Mart Parking Lot" Released: February 14, 2006; 3. "Anywhere but Here" Released: April 26, 2006

Professional ratings
Review scores
| Source | Rating |
|---|---|
| Allmusic | 3.5/5 stars |

Anywhere but Here is the third studio album by American country music artist Chris Cagle. Released on October 4, 2005, through Capitol Records Nashville. The album produced the singles "Miss Me Baby", "Wal-Mart Parking Lot", and the title track, which was also a minor chart hit for Brice Long one year prior to the release of Cagle's version. Also featured on this album is a cover of rock band Bon Jovi's single "Wanted Dead or Alive".

This album has been released with the Copy Control protection system in some regions.

== Track listing ==
| No. | Title | Writer(s) | Length |
|---|---|---|---|
| 1. | "You Might Want to Think About It" | Brett James; Tom Shapiro; Troy Verges | 3:30 |
| 2. | "Wal-Mart Parking Lot" | James | 4:22 |
| 3. | "Miss Me Baby" | Chris Cagle; Monty Powell | 3:54 |
| 4. | "Maria" | Cagle; Powell | 4:42 |
| 5. | "Anywhere but Here" | D. Vincent Williams; Wendell Mobley | 4:03 |
| 6. | "You Still Do That to Me" | Cagle; Powell | 4:16 |
| 7. | "Hey Y'all" | Cagle; Powell | 3:54 |
| 8. | "I Was Made for You" | James; Hillary Lindsey | 4:24 |
| 9. | "Wanted Dead or Alive" | Jon Bon Jovi; Richie Sambora | 5:01 |
| 10. | "When I Get There" | Monty Criswell; Wade Kirby | 4:11 |
| 11. | "I'd Find You" | John Goodwin; Bobby Terry | 3:31 |

== Personnel ==
- Dan Agee - electric guitar
- Chris Cagle - lead vocals
- John Carroll - electric guitar
- Rich Herring - acoustic guitar
- Gary Smith - keyboards
- Michael Spriggs - acoustic guitar
- Ilya Toshinsky - electric guitar
- Steve Turner - drums, percussion
- John Willis - banjo, acoustic guitar, electric guitar
- Robert Wright - bass guitar, acoustic guitar, electric guitar, drum loops, percussion, background vocals
- Jonathan Yudkin - cello, fiddle, mandolin

== Chart performance ==
=== Weekly charts ===
| Chart (2005) | Peak position |
|---|---|
| US Billboard 200 | 24 |
| US Top Country Albums (Billboard) | 4 |

=== Year-end charts ===
| Chart (2005) | Position |
|---|---|
| US Top Country Albums (Billboard) | 70 |
| Chart (2006) | Position |
| US Top Country Albums (Billboard) | 54 |
