= Another You (David Kersh song) =

Single by David Kersh

from the album Goodnight Sweetheart
- Released: January 13, 1997
- Recorded: 1996
- Genre: Country
- Length: 3:51
- Label: Curb
- Songwriter: Brad Paisley
- Producer: Pat McMakin

David Kersh singles chronology
"Goodnight Sweetheart" (1996)	"Another You" (1997)	"Day In, Day Out" (1997)

"Another You" is a song written by Brad Paisley before his own solo career started, and recorded by American country music artist David Kersh. It was released in January 1997 as the third single from his debut studio album Goodnight Sweetheart. The song reached #3 on the Billboard Hot Country Singles & Tracks chart and #14 on the Canadian RPM Country Tracks chart.

== Chart performance ==
"Another You" debuted at number 65 on the U.S. Billboard Hot Country Singles & Tracks for the week of January 18, 1997.

Chart (1997)	Peak position
Canada Country Singles (RPM)	14
US Hot Country Songs (Billboard)	3

=== Year-end charts ===
Chart (1997)	Position
US Country Songs (Billboard)	52
