= Vocal rest =

Resting the vocal folds by not speaking and singing

Vocal rest or voice rest is the practice of resting the vocal folds by not speaking or singing. It typically follows viral infections that cause hoarseness in the voice, such as the common cold or influenza, or more serious vocal disorders such as chorditis or laryngitis. Vocal rest is also recommended after surgery to remove vocal fold lesions, such as vocal fold cysts. Vocal rest is also used by actors and singers before a show by not speaking to rest their voice to get its full potential come show time.

The purpose of vocal rest is to hasten recovery time. It is believed that vocal rest, along with rehydration, will significantly decrease recovery time after a cold. It is generally believed that if one needs to communicate one should speak and not whisper. The reasons for this differ; some believe that whispering merely does not allow the voice to rest and may have a dehydrating effect, while others hold that whispering can cause additional stress to the larynx.
