= Goodnight Sweetheart (album) =

1996 album by David Kersh

Studio album by David Kersh
- Released: October 1, 1996
- Genre: Country
- Length: 36:39
- Label: Curb
- Producer: Pat McMakin

David Kersh chronology
| Goodnight Sweetheart (1996) | If I Never Stop Loving You (1998) |

Singles from Goodnight Sweetheart
- 1. "Breaking Hearts and Taking Names" Released: May 1996; 2. "Goodnight Sweetheart" Released: July 27, 1996; 3. "Another You" Released: January 13, 1997; 4. "Day In, Day Out" Released: May 31, 1997

Professional ratings
Review scores
| Source | Rating |
|---|---|
| AllMusic | 3/5 stars |

Goodnight Sweetheart is the debut studio album by American country music artist David Kersh. It was released on October 1, 1996. The album contains the hit singles "Breaking Hearts and Taking Names", "Goodnight Sweetheart", "Another You", and "Day In, Day Out". Respectively, these reached Nos. 65, 6, 3, and 11 on Billboard Hot Country Singles & Tracks (now Hot Country Songs). "Another You" was written by Brad Paisley.

== Track listing ==
| No. | Title | Writer(s) | Length |
|---|---|---|---|
| 1. | "Breaking Hearts and Taking Names" | Tony Martin, Reese Wilson, Porter Howell | 3:40 |
| 2. | "She Wants Me to Stay (Stay Gone)" | Ronnie Dunn, Dean Dillon | 2:41 |
| 3. | "Goodnight Sweetheart" | Kim Williams, L. David Lewis, Randy Boudreaux | 3:28 |
| 4. | "Things Your Daddy Wouldn't Want Us to Do" | Larry Boone, Will Robinson | 3:30 |
| 5. | "Until Now" | Martin, Wilson, Ron Hellard | 3:19 |
| 6. | "Day In, Day Out" | Marv Green, Thom McHugh | 3:23 |
| 7. | "The Love of a Man" | Roy Hurd | 3:25 |
| 8. | "Boys Will Be Boys" | Tom Littlefield, Rick Rowell | 3:14 |
| 9. | "One Good Reason" | Tim Mensy, Roger Springer | 2:50 |
| 10. | "Another You" | Brad Paisley | 3:51 |
| 11. | "Louisiana Country Mile" | Mark Alan Springer, Jerry Laseter | 3:10 |

== Personnel ==
- Eddie Bayers — drums
- Bruce Bouton — steel guitar, slide guitar
- David Briggs — piano
- Jerry Douglas — Dobro, slide guitar
- John Dymond — bass guitar
- Thom Flora — background vocals
- Larry Franklin — fiddle
- David Kersh — lead vocals, background vocals
- Chris Leuzinger — electric guitar
- Brent Mason — electric guitar
- Michael Rhodes — bass guitar
- Matt Rollings — piano
- Brent Rowan — electric guitar
- Biff Watson — acoustic guitar
- John Willis — electric guitar
- Lonnie Wilson — drums
- Curtis Young — background vocals

== Chart performance ==
| Chart (1996) | Peak position |
|---|---|
| U.S. Billboard Top Country Albums | 21 |
| U.S. Billboard 200 | 169 |
| U.S. Billboard Top Heatseekers | 7 |
