= Ghetto Romance =

2000 single by Damage

Single by Damage

from the album Since You've Been Gone
- B-side: "Maria"; "Midnight Caller" (remix)
- Released: 19 June 2000
- Length: 3:47
- Label: Cooltempo
- Songwriters: Tim Kelley; Bob Robinson; Joe Thomas
- Producer: Tim & Bob

Damage singles chronology
"Love Lady" (1997)	"Ghetto Romance" (2000)	"Rumours" (2000)

"Ghetto Romance" is a song by British R&B group Damage. It was released in June 2000 as the lead single from their second studio album, Since You've Been Gone (2001). The song was written by Tim Kelley, Bob Robinson, and Joe Thomas, and produced by Tim & Bob. It peaked at number seven on the UK Singles Chart.

== Track listings ==
UK CD single

1. "Ghetto Romance" (seven inch mix)
2. "Maria" (featuring Kele Le Roc)
3. "Midnight Caller" (Lovestruck garage mix)
4. "Ghetto Romance" (enhanced video)

UK 12-inch single

A1. "Ghetto Romance" (featuring Siamese) – 4:05
A2. "Ghetto Romance" (Ghetto Thug mix) – 3:52
B1. "Ghetto Romance" (Groove Chronicles mix) – 5:29
B2. "Ghetto Romance" (Trigbag Club Sandwich mix) – 7:48

UK cassette single

1. "Ghetto Romance" (seven inch mix)
2. "Ghetto Romance" (Y-Tribe vocal)
3. "Maria" (featuring Kele Le Roc)

== Charts ==
=== Weekly charts ===
Chart (2000)	Peak position
Europe (Eurochart Hot 100)	34
Scottish Singles Sales (Official Charts)	32
UK Singles (Official Charts)	7
UK Airplay (Music Week)	35
UK Dance (Official Charts)	4
UK Hip Hop/R&B (Official Charts)	1

=== Year-end charts ===
Chart (2000)	Position
UK Singles (OCC)	173
UK Urban (Music Week)	9
