= Love Guaranteed (song) =

1997 single by Damage

Single by Damage

from the album Forever
- B-side: "Troubled Times", "Prove Your Love"
- Released: 10 March 1997
- Length: 3:36
- Label: Big Life
- Songwriters: Bryan Powell; Jimmy "Jam" Harris III; Terry Lewis
- Producer: Cutfather & Joe

Damage singles chronology
"Forever" (1996)	"Love Guaranteed" (1997)	"Wonderful Tonight" (1997)

"Love Guaranteed" is a song by British R&B group Damage, released on 10 March 1997 by Big Life as the fourth single from their debut album, Forever (1997). The song peaked at No. 7 on the UK Singles Chart and was the group's second single to have been produced by Cutfather & Joe, which was remixed for its release as a single. The music video features the group performing the song wearing suits, against a backdrop which could possibly represent a wedding reception or party. Actor Sir Christopher Lee stars in the music video guiding the band through different settings in time.

== Critical reception ==
Gavin Reeve from Smash Hits gave "Love Guaranteed" four out of five, commenting, "Smooth. Cooooool. Yes indeed, Damage are a band with the 'oo' factor. The band that wooed thousands while supporting Boyzone will go a slippin' and a slidin' up the charts with this classy performance. Vocals that nibble your neck and soothe your troubled 'soul', lyrics that promise that whatever you need, Damage can give it to you..."

== Track listings ==
- UK CD1
1. "Love Guaranteed" (Cutfather & Joe radio edit)
2. "Troubled Times" (Richards, Bromfield, Linslee Campbell, Michelle Escoffery; produced by Linslee)
3. "Love Guaranteed" (Silk House Guarantee 12-inch)
- UK CD2
1. "Love Guaranteed" (M-Doc mix)
2. "Prove Your Love"
3. "Love Guaranteed" (Dodge mix)
- UK cassette single
1. "Love Guaranteed" (Cutfather & Joe radio edit)
2. "Troubled Times"
- German 12-inch single
1. "Love Guaranteed" (Elusive club mix) – 6:05
2. "Love Guaranteed" (Dubeluded mlub) – 6:15
3. "Love Guaranteed" (Elusive club mix TV track) – 6:05
4. "Love Guaranteed" (D.Y.M.K. dub) – 6:15
5. "Love Guaranteed" (Elusive club mix instrumental) – 6:05

== Charts ==
=== Weekly charts ===
Chart (1997)	Peak position
Europe (Eurochart Hot 100)	86
Scotland Singles (OCC)	28
UK Singles (OCC)	7
UK Airplay (Music Week)	18
UK Hip Hop/R&B (OCC)	2

=== Year-end charts ===
Chart (1997)	Position
UK Singles (OCC)	158
