= Day In, Day Out (David Kersh song) =

Single by David Kersh

from the album Goodnight Sweetheart
- Released: May 31, 1997
- Genre: Country
- Length: 3:23
- Label: Curb
- Songwriters: Marv Green; Thom McHugh
- Producer: Pat McMakin

David Kersh singles chronology
| "Another You" (1997) | "Day In, Day Out" (1997) | "If I Never Stop Loving You" (1997) |

"Day In, Day Out" is a song written by Marv Green and Thom McHugh, and recorded by American country music artist David Kersh. It was released in May 1997 as the fourth single from his album Goodnight Sweetheart. The song reached No. 11 on the Billboard Hot Country Singles & Tracks chart in September 1997.

== Chart performance ==
| Chart (1997) | Peak position |
|---|---|
| Canada Country Singles (RPM) | 12 |
| US Hot Country Songs (Billboard) | 11 |

=== Year-end charts ===
| Chart (1997) | Position |
|---|---|
| Canada Country Tracks (RPM) | 99 |
