= My Life's Been a Country Song =

Studio album by Chris Cagle
- Released: February 19, 2008
- Genre: Country
- Length: 39:06
- Label: Capitol Nashville
- Producers: Chris Cagle; Scott Hendricks

Chris Cagle chronology
Anywhere but Here (2005)	My Life's Been a Country Song (2008)	The Best of Chris Cagle (2010)

Singles from My Life's Been a Country Song
- 1. "What Kinda Gone" Released: July 23, 2007; 2. "No Love Songs" Released: 2008; 3. "Never Ever Gone" Released: 2008

Professional ratings
Review scores
Source	Rating
Allmusic	3/5 stars
Engine 145	2/5 stars

My Life's Been a Country Song is the fourth studio album by American country music artist Chris Cagle. It was released on February 19, 2008, through Capitol Records Nashville. The album's lead-off single was "What Kinda Gone", which peaked at No. 3 on the country music charts in April 2008, the second single, "No Love Songs", peaked at No. 53, while the third single, "Never Ever Gone", failed to chart.

The album debuted at number eight on the U.S. Billboard 200 chart, selling about 37,000 copies in its first week. It also debuted at number one on Billboard's Top Country Albums chart. It is also Cagle's final album for Capitol.

The song "I Don't Wanna Live" was also recorded by Josh Gracin on his 2008 album We Weren't Crazy as "I Don't Want to Live". "Keep Me From Loving You" was also recorded by Clay Walker on his 2010 album, She Won't Be Lonely Long.

== Track listing ==
No.	Title	Writer(s)	Length
1.	"What Kinda Gone"	Chip Davis; Dave Berg; Candy Cameron	3:01
2.	"No Love Songs"	George Teren; Craig Wiseman	3:58
3.	"It's Good to Be Back"	Andy Childs; Steve Mandile	3:17
4.	"I Don't Wanna Live"	Brett James; Blair Daly	3:37
5.	"Never Ever Gone"	Michael Dulaney; Neil Thrasher; Tom Shapiro	3:01
6.	"If It Isn't One Thing"	Teren; Monty Criswell	3:42
7.	"Keep Me from Loving You"	Thrasher; Wendell Mobley; Lisa Hentrich	3:06
8.	"Little Sundress"	Dallas Davidson; Rhett Akins	4:01
9.	"My Heart Move On"	James; Daly	4:11
10.	"My Life's Been a Country Song"	John Wiggins; Clay Mills	3:17
11.	"Change Me"	John Kennedy; Tammi Kidd; Gregory Becker	3:55

== Personnel ==
Credits adapted from AllMusic.

Vocals

- Chris Cagle – lead vocals
- Perry Coleman – background vocals
- Harry Stinson – background vocals
- Russell Terrell – background vocals
- Neil Thrasher – background vocals

Musicians

- Tom Bukovac – electric guitar
- John Carroll – electric guitar
- Eric Darken – percussion
- Kenny Greenberg – electric guitar
- Mike Johnson – lap steel guitar, pedal steel guitar
- Troy Lancaster – electric guitar

- B. James Lowry – acoustic guitar
- Greg Morrow – drums, percussion
- Gordon Mote – piano, Hammond B-3 organ, Hammond organ
- Jimmie Lee Sloas – bass guitar
- Jonathan Yudkin – fiddle, mandolin, banjo

Production

- Denise Arguijo – art direction
- Drew Bollman – assistant, engineer, mixing
- Chris Cagle – audio production, producer
- Joana Carter – art direction
- Mariana Chavez – photography
- Greg Droman – mixing
- Jedd Hackett – digital editing
- Michelle Hall — art direction

- Russ Harrington – photography
- Scott Hendricks – audio production, overdub engineer, producer
- John Netti – assistant
- Justin Niebank – engineer, mixing
- Lowell Reynolds – assistant
- Patrick Thrasher – digital editing
- Hank Williams – mastering

== Chart performance ==
=== Weekly charts ===
Chart (2008)	Peak position
US Billboard 200	8
US Top Country Albums (Billboard)	1

=== Year-end charts ===
Chart (2008)	Position
US Top Country Albums (Billboard)	58
