= Chris Cagle (album) =

Studio album by Chris Cagle
- Released: April 1, 2003
- Recorded: 2002–2003
- Studios: Curb Studios, Crimescene Studios
- Genre: Country
- Length: 49:05
- Label: Capitol Nashville
- Producers: Chris Cagle, Robert Wright

Chris Cagle chronology
Play It Loud (2000)	Chris Cagle (2003)	Anywhere but Here (2005)

Singles from Chris Cagle
- 1. "What a Beautiful Day" Released: November 4, 2002; 2. "Chicks Dig It" Released: June 24, 2003; 3. "I'd Be Lying" Released: January 31, 2004

Professional ratings
Review scores
Source	Rating
Allmusic	3/5 stars

Chris Cagle is the self-titled second studio album by American country music artist Chris Cagle. Released in 2003 on Capitol Records Nashville, it contains the singles "What a Beautiful Day", "Chicks Dig It", and "I'd Be Lying". Respectively, these peaked at No. 4, No. 5 and No. 39 on the U.S. country singles charts. As with his debut album, Chris Cagle was certified gold in the U.S. for shipments of 500,000 copies.

== Track listing ==
No.	Title	Writer(s)	Length
1.	"What a Beautiful Day"	Chris Cagle, Monty Powell	3:44
2.	"Chicks Dig It"	Cagle, Charlie Crowe	4:00
3.	"Look What I Found"	Brett James, Don Schlitz	4:08
4.	"I Love It When She Does That"	Cagle, Powell	4:47
5.	"Night on the Country"	Cagle, Powell	3:55
6.	"I'd Be Lying"	Cagle	4:26
7.	"Everything"	Frank Rogers	3:34
8.	"It Takes Two"	Cagle, Powell	5:13
9.	"Growin' Love"	Cagle, Powell	5:10
10.	"Just Love Me"	Cagle, Powell	5:09
11.	"Look at What I've Done"	Cagle, Powell, Anna Wilson	4:58

== Personnel ==
=== Musicians ===
- Chris Cagle – lead vocals
- John Carroll – electric guitar
- Shannon Forrest – percussion, drums
- Chris McHugh – percussion, drums, loop programming
- Michael Noble – acoustic guitar
- Gary Smith – keyboards, strings
- Ilya Toshinsky – banjo, electric guitar, classical guitar, resonator guitar
- Steve Turner – drums
- John Willis – acoustic guitar
- Robert Wright – bass guitar, background vocals
- Jonathan Yudkin – fiddle, mandolin, strings, cello, mandocello, octofone

=== Production ===
- Joanna Carter – Art direction
- Marina Chavez – Photography
- Mike "Frog" Griffith – Production coordination
- Robert Hadley – Mastering
- Jennifer Kemp – Stylist
- Joe Rogers – Design
- Doug Sax – Mastering
- Paula Turner – Make-up, hair stylist
- Craig White – Engineer, digital editing, mixing
- Hank Williams – Mastering
- Casey Wood – Assistant
- Robert Wright – Producer, engineer, digital editing

== Chart performance ==
=== Weekly charts ===
Chart (2003)	Peak position
US Billboard 200	15
US Top Country Albums (Billboard)	1

=== Year-end charts ===
Chart (2003)	Position
US Top Country Albums (Billboard)	30
Chart (2004)	Position
US Top Country Albums (Billboard)	50

== Certifications ==
Region	Certification
United States (RIAA)	Gold
