= Goodnight Sweetheart (Joe Diffie song) =

Single by David Kersh

from the album Goodnight Sweetheart
- B-side: "Breaking Hearts and Taking Names"
- Released: July 27, 1996
- Recorded: 1996
- Genre: Country
- Length: 3:28
- Label: Curb
- Songwriters: Kim Williams, L. David Lewis, Randy Boudreaux
- Producer: Pat McMakin

David Kersh singles chronology
"Breaking Hearts and Taking Names" (1996)	"Goodnight Sweetheart" (1996)	"Another You" (1997)

"Goodnight Sweetheart" is a song co-written by Kim Williams, L. David Lewis and Randy Boudreaux. It was recorded by American country music artist Joe Diffie for his 1992 album Regular Joe. The song was later recorded by American country music artist David Kersh for his album Goodnight Sweetheart. Released as the album's second single in July 1996, it reached number 6 on the Billboard Hot Country Singles & Tracks chart but missed the top 40 on the Canadian RPM Country Tracks chart.

== Music video ==
The music video was directed by Chris Rogers and premiered in mid-1996.

== Chart performance ==
"Goodnight Sweetheart" peaked at number 6 on the country charts in the U.S.

Chart (1996)	Peak position
Canada Country Singles (RPM)	44
US Bubbling Under Hot 100 (Billboard)	13
US Hot Country Songs (Billboard)	6
