= Love II Love =

1996 single by Damage

Single by Damage

from the album Forever
- B-side: "All Season Lover"
- Released: 30 September 1996
- Length: 4:25
- Label: Big Life
- Songwriters: Wayne Hector; Ali Tennant; Bryan Powell
- Producer: Cutfather & Joe

Damage singles chronology
"Anything" (1996)	"Love II Love" (1996)	"Forever" (1996)

"Love II Love" is a song by British boy band Damage, released as the second single from their 1997 debut album, Forever. It is widely regarded as the band's breakthrough single, having peaked at No. 12 on the UK Singles Chart and No. 82 in the United States, where it is their only charting single. The song also appeared on the singles charts of Australia, Germany, and New Zealand.

== Music video ==
The music video shows the band being strung up by a woman with alien-like characteristics and being controlled like puppets.

== Track listings ==
- UK CD single
1. "Love II Love" (Cutfather & Joe radio mix)
2. "Love II Love" (Nelson's Downright Filthy mix)
3. "Love II Love" (Soul Boot mix)
4. "All Season Lover"
- UK 12-inch single

A1. "Love II Love" (Soul Boot mix)
A2. "All Season Lover"
B1. "Love II Love" (Cutfather & Joe club mix)
B2. "Love II Love" (Nelson's Downright Filthy mix)

- UK cassette single
1. "Love II Love" (Cutfather & Joe radio mix)
2. "All Season Lover"
- US CD single
1. "Love II Love" (original mix) – 4:06
2. "Love II Love" (radio remix) – 4:02
- US 12-inch single

A1. "Love II Love" (Nelson's Downright Filthy mix) – 5:16
A2. "Love II Love" (Soul Boot mix) – 4:41
A3. "Love II Love" (Soul Inside mix) – 4:53
B1. "Love II Love" (Grant's Pressure dub) – 7:26
B2. "Love II Love" (radio remix) – 4:02
B3. "Love II Love" (original mix) – 4:06

- US cassette single
1. "Love II Love" (original mix)

== Charts ==
Chart (1996–1998)	Peak position
Australia (ARIA)	92
Europe (Eurochart Hot 100)	67
Germany (GfK)	72
New Zealand (Recorded Music NZ)	50
Scotland Singles (OCC)	45
UK Singles (OCC)	12
UK Airplay (Music Week)	20
UK Pop Tip Club Chart (Music Week)	38
UK Dance (OCC)	18
UK Hip Hop/R&B (OCC)	2
US Billboard Hot 100	82

== Release history ==
Region	Date	Format(s)	Label(s)	Ref.
United Kingdom	30 September 1996	12-inch vinyl; CD; cassette	Big Life	
United States	13 May 1997	Rhythmic contemporary radio	Critique	
United States	10 June 1997	Contemporary hit radio	Critique	
