= What Kinda Gone =

Single by Chris Cagle

from the album My Life's Been a Country Song
- Released: July 23, 2007
- Genre: Country
- Length: 3:03
- Label: Capitol Nashville
- Songwriters: Dave Berg; Candyce Cameron; Chip Davis
- Producers: Chris Cagle; Scott Hendricks

Chris Cagle singles chronology
| "Anywhere but Here" (2006) | "What Kinda Gone" (2007) | "No Love Songs" (2008) |

"What Kinda Gone" is a song recorded by American country music singer Chris Cagle. It was released in July 2007 as the first single from his album My Life's Been a Country Song, which was released in early 2008. Having reached a peak position of number 3 on the Billboard Hot Country Songs charts in April 2008, it became Cagle's first Top 10 single since 2003's "Chicks Dig It", his eleventh chart single overall, and his final Top 10 country single. It was written by Dave Berg, Candyce Cameron and Chip Davis.

== Content ==
The narrator's significant other tells him she’s gone, but he wonders what kind of "gone" she is talking about and he proceeds to list off the various meanings of the word.

== Critical reception ==
Kevin John Coyne of Country Universe gave the song an American B+ grade saying that song is "packed with personality" and that he was "smiling from the first verse".

== Chart performance ==
"What Kinda Gone" debuted at number 58 on the U.S. Billboard Hot Country Songs for the week of August 4, 2007.

| Chart (2007–2008) | Peak position |
|---|---|
| Canada Country (Billboard) | 4 |
| Canada Hot 100 (Billboard) | 69 |
| US Hot Country Songs (Billboard) | 3 |
| US Billboard Hot 100 | 54 |
| US Billboard Pop 100 | 96 |

=== Year-end charts ===
| Chart (2008) | Position |
|---|---|
| US Country Songs (Billboard) | 14 |
