= Got My Country On =

Single by Chris Cagle

from the album Back in the Saddle
- Released: August 29, 2011
- Genre: Country
- Length: 3:53
- Label: Bigger Picture Music Group
- Songwriters: Kelly Archer; Justin Weaver; Danny Myrick
- Producer: Keith Stegall

Chris Cagle singles chronology
"Never Ever Gone" (2008)	"Got My Country On" (2011)	"Let There Be Cowgirls" (2012)

"Got My Country On" is a song recorded by American country music artist Chris Cagle. It was released in August 2011 as the first single from his album, Back in the Saddle. The song was written by Kelly Archer, Justin Weaver, and Danny Myrick.

== Critical reception ==
Billy Dukes of Taste of Country gave the song four and a half stars out of five, calling it "the year's strongest effort from a singer attempting a comeback."

== Music video ==
The music video was directed by Marcel and premiered in October 2011.

== Chart performance ==
"Got My Country On" debuted at number 58 on the U.S. Billboard Hot Country Songs chart for the week of September 17, 2011. In March 2012, it became Cagle's first Top 20 single in four years.

Chart (2011–2012)	Peak position
Canada Country (Billboard)	42
US Billboard Hot 100	86
US Hot Country Songs (Billboard)	12

=== Year-end charts ===
Chart (2012)	Position
US Country Songs (Billboard)	56
