= I Breathe In, I Breathe Out =

Single by Chris Cagle

from the album Play It Loud
- B-side: "Country by the Grace of God"
- Released: September 10, 2001
- Genre: Country
- Length: 4:04
- Label: Virgin/Capitol Nashville
- Songwriters: Jon Robbin; Chris Cagle
- Producer: Chris Lindsey

Chris Cagle singles chronology
"Laredo" (2001)	"I Breathe In, I Breathe Out" (2001)	"Country by the Grace of God" (2002)

"I Breathe In, I Breathe Out" is a song recorded and co-written by American country music artist Chris Cagle. It was first recorded by David Kersh on his 1998 album If I Never Stop Loving You; Kersh's version was not released as a single.

Cagle himself later recorded the song for a re-issue of his debut album Play It Loud. Released in September 2001, his version reached Number One on the U.S. Billboard country music charts in early 2002, giving Cagle the only Number One hit of his career. It also reached number 35 on the Billboard Hot 100, his only Top 40 hit to date on that chart.

== Content ==
"I Breathe In, I Breathe Out" is a ballad that discusses the end of a relationship, and coping with it. The narrator discusses what he is doing after the breakup, and when asked by various people what he is doing without his significant other, he replies that he takes each day as it comes and subsequently hopes and waits for his ex to realize that they need each other.

== Music video ==
The music video was directed by Eric Welch and was released in late 2001.

== Peak positions ==
"I Breathe In, I Breathe Out" debuted at number 58 on the U.S. Billboard Hot Country Singles & Tracks for the week of September 22, 2001.

Chart (2001–2002)	Peak position
US Hot Country Songs (Billboard)	1
US Billboard Hot 100	35

=== Year-end charts ===
Chart (2002)	Position
US Country Songs (Billboard)	23
