= My Love Goes On and On =

2000 single by Chris Cagle

Single by Chris Cagle

from the album Play It Loud
- B-side: "Play It Loud"
- Released: July 17, 2000
- Genre: Country
- Length: 3:05
- Label: Virgin Nashville
- Songwriters: Chris Cagle, Don Pfrimmer
- Producer: Robert Wright

Chris Cagle singles chronology
"My Love Goes On and On" (2000)	"Laredo" (2001)

"My Love Goes On and On" is the debut single co-written and recorded by American country music artist Chris Cagle. It was released in July 2000 and is from his debut album Play It Loud. The song peaked at No. 15 on the Hot Country Songs chart. It was written by Cagle and Don Pfrimmer.

== Content ==
The song is an unabashed declaration of never-ending love and devotion.

== Critical reception ==
Chuck Taylor of Billboard magazine reviewed the song favorably, saying that "from Cagle's fiery performance - which is more grit and substance than vocal polish - to Robert Wright's go-for-broke production, this rollicking single is an all-out assault on the senses." He goes on to say that the lyric is "accented by a raging fiddle and pounding percussion."

== Music video ==
The music video was directed by Eric Welch.

== Chart performance ==
"My Love Goes On and On" debuted at number 65 on the U.S. Billboard Hot Country Singles & Tracks chart for the week of July 29, 2000.

Chart (2000)	Peak position
Canada Country (RPM)	32 (Note: "My Love Goes On and On" reached number 32 when RPM ceased publication in November 2000.)
US Hot Country Songs (Billboard)	15
US Billboard Hot 100	76
