= Play It Loud (Chris Cagle album) =

Studio album by Chris Cagle
- Released: October 24, 2000
- Recorded: 2000
- Genre: Country
- Length: 36:21; 44:13 (re-issue)
- Label: Virgin Nashville; Capitol Nashville (re-issue)
- Producer: Robert Wright; Chris Lindsey (new tracks on re-issue)

Chris Cagle chronology
Play It Loud (2000)	Chris Cagle (2003)

Singles from Play It Loud
- 1. "My Love Goes On and On" Released: July 17, 2000; 2. "Laredo" Released: February 12, 2001; 3. "I Breathe In, I Breathe Out" Released: September 10, 2001; 4. "Country by the Grace of God" Released: May 4, 2002

Professional ratings
Review scores
Source	Rating
Allmusic	4/5 stars

Play It Loud is the debut studio album by American country music artist Chris Cagle. It features the singles "My Love Goes On and On", "Laredo", "I Breathe In, I Breathe Out", and "Country by the Grace of God".

The disc was originally issued on Virgin Nashville in 2000, minus the tracks "I Breathe In, I Breathe Out" and "Are You Ever Gonna Love Me." After Virgin shut down its country division and Cagle moved to sister company Capitol Nashville in 2001, the album was re-issued with these additional tracks and new album art. The newly added tracks were produced by Chris Lindsey.

== Track listing ==
No.	Title	Writer(s)	Length
1.	"My Love Goes On and On"	Chris Cagle, Don Pfrimmer	3:05
2.	"Laredo"	Cagle	3:50
3.	"The Safe Side"	Anna Lisa Graham, Jeremy Campbell	4:47
4.	"Country by the Grace of God"	Cagle, M. Jason Greene, Bryan Wayne	3:28
5.	"Ton of Love"	Cagle, Greene	4:05
6.	"Play It Loud"	Cagle, Greene	3:04
7.	"Are You Ever Gonna Love Me"	Chris Lindsey, Aimee Mayo, Marv Green	3:47
8.	"Who Needs the Whiskey"	Cagle, Dick Kaiser, Randy Boudreaux	3:32
9.	"The Love Between a Woman and a Man"	Cagle, Kenny Mims	3:52
10.	"Lovin' You Lovin' Me"	Greene, Cagle, Jerome Earnest	3:33
11.	"Rock the Boat"	M.C. Potts, Taylor Dunn, John Northrup	3:04
12.	"I Breathe In, I Breathe Out"	Cagle, Jon Robbin	4:04

== Personnel ==
- Chris Cagle- lead vocals
- Jon Carroll- electric guitar
- Joe Chemay- bass guitar
- J.T. Corenflos- electric guitar
- Shannon Forrest- drums
- Sonny Garrish- steel guitar
- Wes Hightower- background vocals
- Chris Leuzinger- acoustic guitar
- Michael Noble- acoustic guitar
- Rex Schnelle- acoustic guitar
- Gary Smith- keyboards, piano
- Michael Spriggs- acoustic guitar
- Steve Turner- drums
- Lonnie Wilson- drums
- Robert Wright- bass guitar, acoustic guitar, background vocals
- Jonathan Yudkin- mandolin, violin, viola

== Chart performance ==
=== Weekly charts ===
Chart (2000–2002)	Peak position
US Billboard 200	164
US Top Country Albums (Billboard)	19
US Heatseekers Albums (Billboard)	3

=== Year-end charts ===
Chart (2001)	Position
Canadian Country Albums (Nielsen SoundScan)	93
US Top Country Albums (Billboard)	46
Chart (2002)	Position
US Top Country Albums (Billboard)	32

== Certifications ==
Region	Certification
United States (RIAA)	Gold
