= Miss Me Baby =

Single by Chris Cagle

from the album Anywhere but Here
- B-side: "I Can't Unlove You"
- Released: June 13, 2005
- Genre: Country
- Length: 3:54
- Label: Capitol Nashville
- Songwriters: Chris Cagle; Monty Powell
- Producer: Robert Wright

Chris Cagle singles chronology
"I'd Be Lying" (2004)	"Miss Me Baby" (2005)	"Wal-Mart Parking Lot" (2006)

"Miss Me Baby" is a song co-written and recorded by American country music artist Chris Cagle. It was released in June 2005 as the first single from his album Anywhere but Here. It peaked at number 12 on the Hot Country Songs chart. The song was written by Cagle and Monty Powell.

The commercial single release had Kenny Rogers' "I Can't Unlove You" on the b-side.

== Music video ==
The music video was directed by Eric Welch and premiered in August 18, 2005. It was filmed entirely on location in the Mojave Desert in California. The whole video is Welch performing the song with his band, mixed in with a few solo shots of him walking.

== Chart performance ==
"Miss Me Baby" debuted at number 56 on the U.S. Billboard Hot Country Singles & Tracks chart for the week of June 25, 2005.

Chart (2005)	Peak position
Canada Country (Radio & Records)	29
US Hot Country Songs (Billboard)	12
US Billboard Hot 100	67
US Billboard Pop 100	100
