= Laredo (Chris Cagle song) =

2000 single by Chris Cagle

Single by Chris Cagle

from the album Play It Loud
- B-side: "Lovin' You Lovin' Me"
- Released: February 12, 2001
- Genre: Country
- Length: 3:50
- Label: Virgin Nashville
- Songwriter: Chris Cagle
- Producer: Robert Wright

Chris Cagle singles chronology
"My Love Goes On and On" (2000)	"Laredo" (2001)	"I Breathe In, I Breathe Out" (2001)

"Laredo" is a song written and recorded by American country music artist Chris Cagle. It was released in February 2001 as the second single from his debut album Play It Loud. It peaked at #8 on the Hot Country Songs chart.

== Content ==
The song is a recollection of a lost lover that the narrator has had in the city of Laredo, Texas. It is composed in the key of F major. Cagle said that the idea came to him one morning when he was listening to his radio and driving on Interstate 40. He heard "Galveston" by Glen Campbell on the radio and began thinking of other songs about cities in Texas. He decided to pick Laredo, Texas, because it was one of the few cities for which he could not think of an existing song. After seeing a billboard that said "invest in your city's future", he came up with the concept of "a city being treated like an individual" and "pleading with the city to not let her leave."

== Music video ==
The music video was directed by Eric Welch. It shows Cagle trying to find his lover (who is seen in a stunning red dress) throughout a stone castle. His every chance at finding her fails, but in the end before disappearing she leaves a piece of her dress on the ground for him to keep in memory. Scenes of Cagle performing the song inside different parts of the stone building are seen throughout, as well as shots of the woman by herself sitting on a high wall and in a room filled with candles (where one of the performance scenes also takes place). It was filmed over 2 days in Lost Pines, TX, at a historic castle made entirely of stone, built in the 1800s.

The official video from the Play It Loud album includes many scenes from the Mission San José y San Miguel de Aguayo historic Catholic mission in San Antonio, Texas.

== Chart performance ==
"Laredo" debuted at number 60 on the U.S. Billboard Hot Country Singles & Tracks chart for the week of February 17, 2001.

Chart (2001)	Peak position
US Hot Country Songs (Billboard)	8
US Billboard Hot 100	60

=== Year-end charts ===
Chart (2001)	Position
US Country Songs (Billboard)	35
