= Jade Jones (singer) =

British R&B singer and chef (born 1979)

- Born: 12 February 1979 (age 47); London, England
- Origin: Finchley, London, England
- Genres: R&B
- Occupations: Singer; songwriter; television personality; chef
- Years active: 1994–present
- Labels: Big Life; Cooltempo; EMI
- Spouse: Emma Bunton (m. 2021)

Jade Jones (born 12 February 1979) is a British R&B singer, songwriter, television personality and chef. He is best known for being the lead singer of the group Damage.

After leaving Damage, Jones joined CherryBlackStone, which appeared on Channel 4's Bo in the USA. In 2006, he participated in and went on to win the Channel 4 reality show The Games.

Jones left CherryBlackStone in 2008 following his son's birth and became a full-time trainee chef.

In 2014, Jones appeared with three of the original Damage members—Rahsaan J Bromfield, Andrez Harriott and Noel Simpson—in the second series of The Big Reunion on ITV2.

== Personal life ==
Jones was born to a Jamaican father and a British mother. Since 1998, he was in an on/off relationship with Spice Girls singer Emma Bunton. The couple became engaged on 21 January 2011. The couple have two children, born on 10 August 2007, and 6 May 2011. Jones and Bunton married on 13 July 2021.
