= What a Beautiful Day (song) =

Single by Chris Cagle

from the album Chris Cagle
- Released: November 4, 2002
- Genre: Country
- Length: 3:44
- Label: Capitol Nashville
- Songwriters: Chris Cagle; Monty Powell
- Producers: Chris Cagle, Robert Wright

Chris Cagle singles chronology
"Country by the Grace of God" (2002)	"What a Beautiful Day" (2002)	"Chicks Dig It" (2003)

"What a Beautiful Day" is a song co-written and recorded by American country music artist Chris Cagle. It was released in November 2002 as the lead single from his self-titled album. The song reached the top 5 on the Billboard Hot Country Singles & Tracks chart, peaking at number 4 and also peaked at number 41 on the Billboard Hot 100. It was written by Cagle and Monty Powell.

== Content ==
The song is a moderate up-tempo mostly accompanied by piano and fiddle. It describes a day-by-day chronicle of a man and woman who meet, eventually falling in love and marrying. It starts with day one, on which the two lovers met; day two, where they "grabbed a bite to eat and talked all afternoon"; day fourteen, where they watch a movie together; and so forth. Throughout the rest of the song, various random days throughout the relationship are highlighted in a similar fashion, most notably in the bridge, where the singer looks forward to a long marriage with his lover ("Day eighteen thousand, two hundred and fifty-three / Well, that's fifty years — yeah, here's to you and me").

== Music video ==
The music video was co-directed by Eric Welch and Chris Cagle and premiered in early 2003.

== Chart performance ==
"What a Beautiful Day" debuted at number 58 on the U.S. Billboard Hot Country Singles & Tracks chart for the week of November 9, 2002. It re-entered the chart at number 57 as an official single for the week of November 23, 2002.

Chart (2002–2003)	Peak position
US Hot Country Songs (Billboard)	4
US Billboard Hot 100	41

=== Year-end charts ===
Chart (2003)	Position
US Country Songs (Billboard)	26
