= Chicks Dig It =

Single by Chris Cagle

from the album Chris Cagle
- Released: June 24, 2003
- Genre: Country
- Length: 4:00 (Album version); 3:31 (Single version)
- Label: Capitol Nashville
- Songwriters: Chris Cagle; Charlie Crowe
- Producers: Chris Cagle, Robert Wright

Chris Cagle singles chronology
"What a Beautiful Day" (2002)	"Chicks Dig It" (2003)	"I'd Be Lying" (2004)

"Chicks Dig It" is a song co-written and recorded by American country music singer Chris Cagle. It was released in June 2003 as the second single from his self-titled album. It peaked at number 5 on the U.S. country charts and at number 53 on the Billboard Hot 100. It was written by Cagle and Charlie Crowe.

== Content ==
A moderate up-tempo with country rock influences, "Chicks Dig It" tells of the narrator performing various stunts—often injuring himself in the process—in attempts to impress females because the "chicks dig it".

== Music video ==
The music video features Cagle and his band performing at a local skate park and a race track. The music video was directed by Peter Zavadil. The video had cameo appearances by freestyle motocross rider “Cowboy” Kenny Bartram and Kevin Robinson (BMX rider).

== Chart performance ==
The song debuted at number 57 on the Hot Country Singles & Tracks chart dated June 28, 2003. Having charted for 30 weeks on that chart, it peaked at number 5 on the chart dated December 20, 2003. It also peaked at number 53 on the Billboard Hot 100.

=== Charts ===
Chart (2003)	Peak position
US Hot Country Songs (Billboard)	5
US Billboard Hot 100	53

=== Year-end charts ===
Chart (2003)	Position
US Country Songs (Billboard)	50

== Parodies ==
- American parody artist Cledus T. Judd released a parody of "Chicks Dig It" titled "The Chicks Did It" on his 2003 album The Original Dixie Hick.
