= Big Life =

Record label

Big Life was a record label established in 1987 by Jazz Summers and Tim Parry. It featured hundreds of releases from artists such as the Orb, Stare, Yazz, Junior Reid, Coldcut, De La Soul, and Damage.

In 1999, the label was put into receivership. In 2008, it was purchased by Universal Music Publishing Group.

== See also ==
- Lists of record labels
