= Glossary of music terminology =

A variety of musical terms are encountered in printed scores, music reviews, and program notes. Most of the terms are Italian, in accordance with the Italian origins of many European musical conventions. Sometimes, the special musical meanings of these phrases differ from the original or current Italian meanings. Most of the other terms are taken from French and German, indicated by Fr. and Ger., respectively.

Unless specified, the terms are Italian or English. The list can never be complete: some terms are common, and others are used rarely and new ones are made from time to time. Some composers prefer terms from their own language rather than the standard terms listed here.

== 0–9 ==
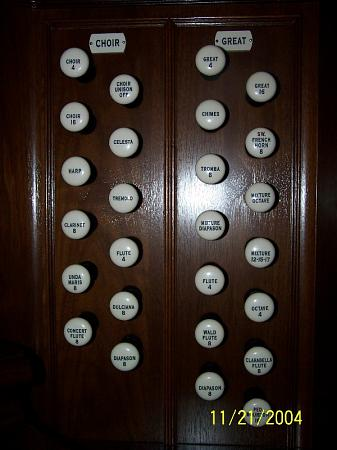
On these organ stops, some of the knobs have numbers indicating the length in feet of the longest (the lowest note) organ pipe of the stop

1′
"sifflet" or one foot organ stop
I
usually for orchestral string instruments, used to indicate that the player should play the passage on the highest-pitched, thinnest string
1 3/5′
Tierce organ stop
2′
two feet – pipe organ indication; see Organ stop § Pitch and length
2 2/3′
pipe organ stop for the twelfth interval
II
usually for orchestral string instruments, used to indicate that the player should play the passage on the second highest string; also used with the Cymbal stop on a pipe organ with the II indicating two ranks of pipes combined to make this stop's sound
III
usually for orchestral string instruments, used to indicate that the player should play the passage on the third-highest string; also used with the Scharf or Mixtur stop on a pipe organ with the III indicating three ranks of pipes
4′
four feet – pipe organ rank that speaks one octave higher than 8′
IV
usually for orchestral string instruments, used to indicate that the player should play the passage on the lowest-pitched, thickest string, i.e. the fourth-highest string
IV–VI
mixture stop on pipe organ; the Roman numeral indicates how many ranks of pipes the stop includes
8′
eight-foot pipe – pipe organ indication for a stop sounding at concert pitch and where the lowest note's pipe is about 8 feet long
808s′
Originally a classic Roland drum machine, the term now almost exclusively refers to the deep, synthetic sub-bass kick drum
16′
sixteen-foot pipe – pipe organ indication calling for one octave below 8′ where the lowest note's pipe is about 16 feet long
32′
thirty-two-foot pipe – pipe organ indication calling for two octaves below 8′ where the lowest note's pipe is about 32 feet long; also called sub-bass
64′
sixty-four-foot pipe – pipe organ indication calling for three octaves below 8′ where the lowest note's pipe is about 64 feet long (only a few organs in the world have this low of a pitch)

== A ==
a or à (Fr.)
at, to, by, for, in
à la (Fr.)
in the style of...
a battuta
Return to normal tempo after a deviation. Not recommended in string parts, due to possible confusion with battuto (qv.); use a tempo, which means the same thing
a bene placito
Up to the performer
a cappella
lit. "in a chapel"; vocal parts only, without instrumental accompaniment
a capriccio
A free and capricious approach to tempo
a due (a 2)
intended as a duet; for two voices or instruments; together; two instruments are to play in unison after a solo passage for one of the instruments
a niente
To nothing; indicating a diminuendo which fades completely away
a piacere
At pleasure (i.e. the performer need not follow the rhythm strictly, for example in a cadenza)
a prima vista
lit. "at first sight". Sight-reading (i.e. played or sung from written notation without prior review of the written material; refer to the figure)
a tempo
In time (i.e. the performer should return to the stable tempo, such as after an accelerando or ritardando); also may be found in combination with other terms such as a tempo giusto (in strict time) or a tempo di menuetto (at the speed of a minuet)
ab (Ger.)
off, organ stops or mutes
abafando (Port.)
muffled, muted
abandon or avec (Fr.)
free, unrestrained, passionate
abbandonatamente, con abbandono
freely, in relaxed mode
aber (Ger.)
but
accarezzevole
Expressive and caressing
accelerando (accel.)
Accelerating; gradually increasing the tempo
accelerato
with increased tempo
accent
Accent, emphasis
accentato/accentuato
Accented; with emphasis
acceso
Ignited, on fire
accessible
Music that is easy to listen to/understand
acciaccato
Broken down, crushed; the sounding of the notes of a chord not quite simultaneously, but from bottom to top
acciaccatura
Crushing (i.e. a very fast grace note that is "crushed" against the note that follows and takes up no value in the measure)
accidental
A note that is not part of the scale indicated by the key signature.
accompagnato
Accompanied (i.e. with the accompaniment following the soloist, who may speed up or slow down at will)
accuratezza
Precision; accuracy. con accuratezza: with precision
acoustic
Relating to music produced by instruments, as opposed to electric or electronic means
ad libitum (commonly ad lib; Latin)
At liberty (i.e. the speed and manner of execution are left to the performer. It can also mean improvisation.)
adagietto
Fairly slowly (but faster than adagio)
adagio
Slowly and slower than andante
adagissimo
Very, very slowly
affannato, affannoso
Anguished
affetto or con affetto
with affect (that is, with emotion)
affettuoso, affettuosamente, or affectueusement (Fr.)
With affect (that is, with emotion); see also con affetto
affrettando
Hurrying, pressing onwards
agile
Agile, nimble
agitato
Agitated
al or alla
To the, in the manner of (al before masculine nouns, alla before feminine)
alcuna licenza
Used in con alcuna licenza, meaning (play) with some freedom in the time, see rubato
alla breve
In cut-time; two beats per measure or the equivalent thereof
alla marcia
In the style of a march
alla polacca
In the style of a polonaise, a 3/4 dance
alla Siciliana
In the style of a graceful Sicilian rustic dance;
allargando
Broadening, becoming progressively slower
allegretto
A little lively, moderately fast
allegretto vivace
A moderately quick tempo
allegrezza
Cheerfulness, joyfulness
allegrissimo
Very fast, though slower than presto
allegro
Cheerful or brisk; but commonly interpreted as lively, fast
all'ottava
"at the octave", see ottava
alt (Eng.), alt dom, or altered dominant
A jazz term which instructs chord-playing musicians such as a jazz pianist or jazz guitarist to perform a dominant (V7) chord with at least one (often both) altered (sharpened or flattened) 5th or 9th
altissimo
Very high; see also in altissimo
alto
High; often refers to a particular range of voice, higher than a tenor but lower than a soprano
alzate sordini
Lift or raise the mutes (i.e. remove mutes)
am Steg (Ger.)
At the bridge (i.e. playing a bowed string instrument near its bridge, which produces a heavier, stronger tone); see sul ponticello
amabile
Amiable, pleasant
ambitus (Lat.)
Range between highest and lowest note
amore or amor (Sp./Port., sometimes It.)
Love; con amore: with love, tenderly
amoroso
Loving
anacrusis
A note or notes that precede the first full bar; a pickup
andamento
A fugue subject of above-average length
andante
At a walking pace (i.e. at a moderate tempo)
andantino
Slightly faster than andante (but earlier it is sometimes used to mean slightly slower than andante)
ängstlich (Ger.)
Anxiously
anima
Soul; con anima: with feeling
animandosi
Progressively more animated
animato, animé
Animated, lively
ansatz
A German music term with three possible meanings. In wind instrument playing this word means embouchure. In singing this means the preparing or disposition of the vocal apparatus at the time of vocal onset for a given note or phrase. In piano playing this word means touch; usually in association to the attack of a note.
antiphon
A liturgical or other composition consisting of choral responses, sometimes between two choirs; a passage of this nature forming part of another composition; a repeated passage in a psalm or other liturgical piece, similar to a refrain.
antiphonal
A style of composition in which two sections of singers or instrumentalists exchange sections or music one after the other; typically the performers are on different sides of a hall or venue
apaisé (Fr.)
Calmed
appassionato
Passionate
appoggiatura or leaning note
One or more grace notes that take up some note value of the next full note.
arco
The bow used for playing some string instruments (i.e. played with the bow, as opposed to pizzicato, in music for bowed instruments); normally used to cancel a pizzicato direction
aria
Self-contained piece for one voice usually with orchestral accompaniment (which may be provided by a pianist using an orchestral reduction)
arietta
A short aria
arioso
Airy, or like an air (a melody) (i.e. in the manner of an aria); melodious
armonioso
Harmonious
arpeggio, arpeggiato
played like a harp (i.e. the notes of the chords are to be played quickly one after another instead of simultaneously); in music for piano, this is sometimes a solution in playing a wide-ranging chord whose notes cannot be played otherwise; arpeggios are frequently used as an accompaniment; see also broken chord
articulato
Articulate
assai
Much, very much
assez (Fr.)
Enough, sufficiently
attacca
Attack or attach; go straight on (i.e. at the end of a movement, a direction to attach the next movement to the previous one, without a gap or pause). Often used as "attacca subito," meaning a "sudden" movement transition (literally, "attack suddenly").
Ausdruck (Ger.)
Expression
ausdrucksvoll or mit Ausdruck (Ger.)
Expressively, with expression
avec (Fr.)
With

== B ==
B
German for B flat (also in Swedish, Norwegian, Finnish, Icelandic, Danish, Croatian, Estonian, Hungarian and Polish); H in German is B natural
ballabile
(from the Italian Ballabile meaning "danceable") In ballet, a dance performed by the corps de ballet. The term Grand ballabile is used if nearly all participants (including principal characters) of a particular scene in a full-length work perform a large-scale dance.
bar, or measure
unit of music containing a number of beats as indicated by a time signature; also the vertical bar enclosing it
barbaro
Barbarous (notably used in Allegro barbaro by Béla Bartók)
baritone
A male vocal range that lies between the ranges of bass and tenor
Bartók pizzicato
An instruction to string performers to play a pizzicato note to pull the string away from the fingerboard so that it snaps back percussively on the fingerboard.
bass
The lowest of the standard four voice ranges (bass, tenor, alto, soprano); the lowest melodic line in a musical composition, often thought of as defining and supporting the harmony; in an orchestral context, the term usually refers to the double bass.
basso continuo
Continuous bass, i.e. a bass accompaniment part played continuously throughout a piece by a chordal instrument (pipe organ, harpsichord, lute, etc.), often with a bass instrument, to give harmonic structure; used especially in the Baroque period
battement (Fr.)
Used in the 17th century to refer to ornaments consisting of two adjacent notes, such as trills or mordents
battuto (Ital.)
To strike the strings with the bow (on a bowed stringed instrument)
beam
Horizontal or diagonal line used to connect multiple consecutive notes
beat

1. The pronounced rhythm of music
2. One single stroke of a rhythmic accent

belebt or belebter (Ger.)
Spirited, vivacious, lively
bellicoso
Warlike, aggressive (English cognate is "bellicose")
ben or bene
Well; in ben marcato ("well marked") for example
bend
In jazz, either establishing a pitch, sliding down half a step and returning to the original pitch or sliding up half a step from the original note
beschleunigt (Ger.)
Accelerated, as in mit beschleunigter Geschwindigkeit, at an accelerated tempo
bewegt (Ger.)
Moved, with speed
binary
A musical form in two sections: AB
bird's eye
Slang for fermata, which instructs the performer to hold a note or chord as long as they wish or following cues from a conductor
bis (Fr., It.)
Twice (i.e. repeat the relevant action or passage)
bisbigliando
lit. "whispering"; most commonly denoting a timbral trill (a trill between two ways to play the same note with no change in pitch)
bocca chiusa
with closed mouth (sometimes abbreviated B.C.)
bravura
Boldness; as in con bravura, boldly, flaunting technical skill
breit (Ger.)
Broad
bridge

1. Transitional passage connecting two sections of a composition, or between two A sections (e.g., in an A/B/A form).
2. Part of a violin family or guitar/lute stringed instrument that holds the strings in place and transmits their vibrations to the resonant body of the instrument.

brillante
Brilliantly, with sparkle. Play in a showy and spirited style.
brio or brioso
Vigour; usually in con brio: with spirit or vigour
broken chord
A chord in which the notes are not all played at once, but in some more or less consistent sequence. They may follow singly one after the other, or two notes may be immediately followed by another two, for example. See also arpeggio, which as an accompaniment pattern may be seen as a kind of broken chord; see Alberti bass.
bruscamente
Brusquely, suddenly

== C ==
cabaletta
The concluding, rapid, audience-rousing section of an aria
cadence
A melodic or harmonic configuration that creates a sense of resolution
cadenza
A solo section, usually in a concerto or similar work, that is used to display the performer's technique, sometimes at considerable length
calando
Falling away, or lowering (i.e. getting slower and quieter; ritardando along with diminuendo)
calma
Calm; so con calma, calmly. Also calmato meaning calmed, relaxed
calore
Warmth; so con calore, warmly
cambiare
To change (i.e. any change, such as to a new instrument)
cambiata
An ornamental tone following a principal tone by a skip up or down, usually of a third, and proceeding in the opposite direction by a step, not to be confused with changing tone.
canon or kanon (Ger.)
A theme that is repeated and imitated and built upon by other instruments with a time delay, creating a layered effect; see Pachelbel's Canon.
cantabile or cantando
In a singing style. In instrumental music, a style of playing that imitates the way the human voice might express the music, with a measured tempo and flexible legato.
cantilena
a vocal melody or instrumental passage in a smooth, lyrical style
canto
Chorus; choral; chant
cantus mensuratus or cantus figuratus (Lat.)
Meaning respectively "measured song" or "figured song". Originally used by medieval music theorists, it refers to polyphonic song with exactly measured notes and is used in contrast to cantus planus.
capo
1. capo (short for capotasto: "nut") : A key-changing device for stringed instruments (e.g. guitars and banjos)
2. head (i.e. the beginning, as in da capo)
capriccio
"A humorous, fanciful, or bizarre, composition, often characterized by an idiosyncratic departure from current stylistic norms." See also: Capriccio (disambiguation)
capriccioso
Capricious, unpredictable, volatile
cassa
Drum, usually an orchestral bass drum. Sometimes written as Gran Cassa where Gran specifically means Bass
cavalleresco
Chivalrous (used in Carl Nielsen's violin concerto)
cedendo, ced.
Yielding, giving way (getting slower)
cédez (Fr.)
Yield, give way
cesura or caesura (Lat.)
Break, stop; (i.e. a complete break in sound) (sometimes nicknamed "railroad tracks" in reference to their appearance)
chiuso
Closed (i.e. muted by hand) (for a horn, or similar instrument; but see also bocca chiusa, which uses the feminine form)
chord factor
A note in a chord with a unique note name, named for its interval above the root when the chord is in root and simple position
coda
A tail (i.e. a closing section appended to a movement)
codetta
A small coda, but usually applied to a passage appended to a section of a movement, not to a whole movement
col or colla
with the (col before a masculine noun, colla before a feminine noun); (see next for example)
col canto
with the singer, see also colla voce
col legno
with the wood: for bowed strings, strike the strings with the stick of the bow (col legno battuto) or draw the stick across the strings (col legno tratto)
col pugno
With the fist (e.g., bang the piano with the fist)
coll'ottava
With the addition of the octave note above or below the written note; abbreviated as col 8, coll' 8, and c. 8va
colla parte
literally "with the part". An indication that another (written-out) part should be followed, i.e. accommodate the tempo, expression, phrasing, and possible rubato of the leading part. In vocal music, also expressed by colla voce
colla voce
literally "with the voice". An instruction, in a choral or orchestral part, that a vocal part should be followed, e.g., play the same notes as the vocal part and accommodate the tempo, expression, etc. of the vocalist
coloratura
Coloration (i.e. elaborate ornamentation of a vocal line, or a soprano voice that is well-suited to such elaboration)
colossale
Enormous, immense, colossal (notably used in the first movement of Prokofiev's second piano concerto)
come prima
As before, typically referring to an earlier tempo
come sopra
As above (i.e. like the previous tempo)
common time
The time signature 4/4: four beats per measure, each beat a quarter note (a crotchet) in length. 4/4 is often written on the musical staff as. The symbol is not a C as an abbreviation for common time, but a broken circle; the full circle at one time stood for triple time, 3/4.
comodo
Comfortable (i.e. at moderate speed); also, allegro comodo, tempo comodo, etc.
comp
1. abbreviation of accompanying, accompanying music, accompaniment
2. describes the chords, rhythms, and countermelodies that instrumental players used to support a musician's melody and improvised solos.
3. Ostinato
comping (jazz)
1. to comp; action of accompanying.
con
With; used in very many musical directions, for example con allegrezza (with liveliness), con calma (calmly lit. 'with calm'); (see also col and colla)
con dolcezza
See dolce
con sordina or con sordine (plural)
With a mute, or with mutes. Frequently seen in music as (incorrect Italian) con sordino, or con sordini (plural).
concerto
Composition for solo instrument(s) and orchestra
concerto grosso
Composition for a group of solo instruments (concertino or soli) and orchestra (ripieno or tutti)
conjunct
An adjective applied to a melodic line that moves by step (intervals of a 2nd) rather than in disjunct motion (by leap).
contralto
Lowest female singing voice type
contrapuntalism
See counterpoint
coperti
(plural of coperto) covered (i.e. on a drum, muted with a cloth)
corda
String. On the piano it refers to use of the soft pedal, which controls whether the hammer strikes one or three strings; see una corda, tre corde below.
count
Series of regularly occurring sounds to assist with ready identification of beat
crescendo (cresc.)
Growing; (i.e. progressively louder) (contrast diminuendo)
cuivré
Brassy. Used almost exclusively as a French horn technique to indicate a forced, rough tone. A note marked both stopped and loud will be cuivré automatically
custos
Symbol at the very end of a staff of music which indicates the pitch for the first note of the next line as a warning of what is to come. The custos was commonly used in handwritten Renaissance and typeset Baroque music.
cut time
Same as the meter 2/2: two half-note (minim) beats per measure. Notated and executed like common time (4/4), except with the beat lengths doubled. Indicated by. This comes from a literal cut of the symbol of common time. Thus, a quarter note in cut time is only half a beat long, and a measure has only two beats. See also alla breve.

== D ==
da capo
From the head (i.e. from the beginning) (see also capo)
dal segno (D.S.)
From the sign
dal segno alla coda (D.S. alla coda)
Repeat to the sign and continue to the coda sign, then play coda
dal segno al fine (D.S. al fine)
From the sign to the end (i.e. return to a place in the music designated by the sign and continue to the end of the piece)
dal segno segno alla coda (D.S.S. alla coda)
Same as D.S. alla coda, but with a double segno
dal segno segno al fine (D.S.S. al fine)
From the double sign to the end (i.e. return to place in the music designated by the double sign (see D.S. alla coda) and continue to the end of the piece)
decelerando
Slowing down; decelerating; opposite of accelerando (same as ritardando or rallentando)
deciso
Firm
declamando
Solemn, expressive, impassioned
decrescendo (decresc.)
Gradually decreasing volume (same as diminuendo)
deest
From the Latin deesse meaning to be missing; placed after a catalogue abbreviation to indicate that this particular work does not appear in it; the plural, desunt, refers to several works
delicatamente
Delicately
delicatissimo
Very delicate
delicato
Delicate
détaché (Fr.)
Act of playing notes separately
devoto
Pious, religious
diminuendo, dim.
Dwindling (i.e. with gradually decreasing volume) (same as decrescendo)
disjunct
An adjective applied to a melodic line which moves by leap (intervals of more than a 2nd) as opposed to conjunct motion (by step)
di
Of
dissonante
Dissonant
divisi (div.)
Divided (i.e. in a part in which several musicians normally play exactly the same notes they are instead to split the playing of the written simultaneous notes among themselves); it is most often used for string instruments, since with them another means of execution is often possible (the return from divisi is marked unisono)
doit
In jazz, a note that slides to an indefinite pitch chromatically upwards
dolce
Sweet; con dolcezza: with sweetness, sweetly
dolcemente
Sweetly
dolcissimo
Very sweet
dolente
Sorrowful, plaintive
dolore
Pain, distress, sorrow, grief; con dolore: with sadness
doloroso
Sorrowful, plaintive
doppio movimento
lit. Double movement, i.e. the note values are halved
double dot
Two dots placed side by side after a note to indicate that it is to be lengthened by three quarters of its value
double stop
The technique of playing two notes simultaneously on a bowed string instrument
doux, douce
gentle, sweet, soft
downtempo
A slow, moody, or decreased tempo or played or done in such a tempo. Also a genre of electronic music based on this (downtempo)
drammatico
Dramatic
drone
Bass note or chord performed continuously throughout a composition
drop
In jazz, a note that slides to an indefinite pitch chromatically downwards
duolo
(Ital.) grief
dumpf (Ger.)
Dull
Dur (Ger.)
major; used in key signatures as, for example, A-Dur (A major), B-Dur (B♭ major), or H-Dur (B major) (see also Moll (minor))
dynamics
The relative volume in the execution of a piece of music

== E ==
e (Ital.) or ed (Ital., used before vowels)
And
eco
The Italian word for "echo"; an effect in which a group of notes is repeated, usually more softly, and perhaps at a different octave, to create an echo effect
égal (Fr.)
Equal
eilend (Ger.)
Hurrying
ein wenig (Ger.)
A little
einfach (Ger.)
Simple
emporté (Fr.)
Fiery, impetuous
en animant (Fr.)
Becoming very lively
en cédant (Fr.)
Yielding
en dehors (Fr.)
Prominently, a directive to make the melody stand out
en mesure (Fr.)
In time
en pressant (Fr.)
Hurrying forward
en retenant (Fr.)
Slowing, holding back
en serrant (Fr.)
Becoming quicker
encore (Fr.)
Again (i.e. a request to perform once more a passage or a piece); a performer returning to the stage to perform an unlisted piece
energico
Energetic, strong
enfatico
Emphatic
eroico
Heroic
espansivo
Effusive; excessive in emotional expression; gushy
espirando
Expiring (i.e. dying away)
espressione
Expression; e.g. con (gran, molta) espressione: with (great, much) expression
espressivo, espress. or espr.
(Italian) Expressive
estinto
Extinct, extinguished (i.e. as soft as possible, lifeless, barely audible)
esultazione
Exultation
et (Fr.)
And
Étude (Fr.)
A composition intended for practice
etwas (Ger.)
As an adverb, little, somewhat, slightly
etwas bewegter (Ger.)
Moving forward a little

== F ==
facile
Easy
fall
In jazz, a note of definite pitch sliding downwards to another note of definite pitch
falsetto
vocal register above the normal voice
fantasia
A piece not adhering to any strict musical form; can also be used in con fantasia: with imagination
feierlich (Ger.)
Solemn, solemnly
fermata
Stop (i.e. a rest or note to be held for a duration that is at the discretion of the performer or conductor) (sometimes called pause or bird's eye); a fermata at the end of a first or intermediate movement or section is usually moderately prolonged, but the final fermata of a symphony may be prolonged for much longer than the note's value, often twice its printed length or more for dramatic effect
feroce
Ferocious
festivamente
Cheerfully, in a celebratory mode
feurig (Ger.)
Fiery
fieramente
Proudly
fil di voce
"thread of voice", very quiet, pianissimo
fill (Eng.)
A jazz or rock term which instructs performers to improvise a scalar passage or riff to "fill in" the brief time between lyrical phrases, the lines of melody, or between two sections
fine
The end, often in phrases like al fine (to the end)
fioritura
the florid embellishment of melodic lines, either notated by a composer or improvised during a performance.
flat
A symbol (♭) that lowers the pitch of a note by a semitone. Also an adjective to describe a singer or musician performing a note in which the intonation is an eighth or a quarter of a semitone too low.
flautando
Flutelike mode; used especially for string instruments to indicate a light, rapid bowing over the fingerboard
flebile
Feeble, low volume
flessibile
flexible
focoso or fuocoso
Fiery (i.e. passionate)
forte (f)
Strong (i.e. to be played or sung loudly)
forte-piano (fp)
Strong-gentle (i.e. loud, then immediately soft; see dynamics)
fortepiano
An early pianoforte
fortissimo (ff)
Very loud (see note at pianissimo)
fortississimo (fff)
As loud as possible
forza
Musical force; con forza: with force
forzando (fz)
See sforzando
freddo
Cold; hence depressive, unemotional
fresco
Fresh
fröhlich (Ger.)
Lively, joyfully
fugue (Fr.), fuga (Latin and Italian)
Literally "flight"; hence a complex and highly regimented contrapuntal form in music; a short theme (the subject) is introduced in one voice (or part) alone, then in others, with imitation and characteristic development as the piece progresses
funebre
Funeral; often seen as marcia funebre (funeral march), indicating a stately and plodding tempo
fuoco
Fire; con fuoco: with fire, in a fiery manner
furia
Fury
furioso
Furious

== G ==
G.P.
Grand Pause, General Pause; indicates to the performers that the entire ensemble has a rest of indeterminate length, often as a dramatic effect during a loud section
gaudioso
With joy
gemächlich (Ger.)
Unhurried, at a leisurely pace
gemendo
Groaningly
gentile
Gentle
geschwind (Ger.)
Quickly
geteilt (Ger.)
See divisi
getragen (Ger.)
Solemnly, in a stately tempo
giocoso
Playful
gioioso
With joy
giusto
Strict, exact, right (e.g. tempo giusto in strict time)
glissando
A continuous sliding from one pitch to another (a true glissando), or an incidental scale executed while moving from one melodic note to another (an effective glissando). See glissando for further information; and compare portamento.
grace note
An extra note added as an embellishment and not essential to the harmony or melody.
grandioso
Grand, solemn
grave
Slow and serious
grazioso (Fr. gracieusement)
Graceful
guerriero
Warlike, martial
gustoso
(It. tasteful, agreeable) With happy emphasis and forcefulness; in an agreeable manner

== H ==
H
German for B natural; B in German means B flat
Hauptstimme (Ger.)
Main voice, chief part (i.e. the contrapuntal line of primary importance, in opposition to Nebenstimme)
hemiola (English, from Greek)
The imposition of a pattern of rhythm or articulation other than that implied by the time signature; specifically, in triple time (for example in 3/4) the imposition of a duple pattern (as if the time signature were, for example, 2/4). See Syncopation.
hervortretend (Ger.)
Prominent, pronounced
hold, see fermata
homophony
A musical texture with one voice (or melody line) accompanied by subordinate chords; also used as an adjective (homophonic). Compare with polyphony, in which several independent voices or melody lines are performed at the same time.
hook
A musical idea, often a short riff, passage or phrase, that is used in popular music to make a song appealing and to "catch the ear of the listener".

== I ==
immer (Ger.)
Always
imperioso
Imperious, overbearing
impetuoso
Impetuous
improvvisando
With improvisation
improvvisato
Improvised, or as if improvised
improvise
To create music at the spur of the moment, spontaneously, and without preparation (often over a given harmonic framework or chord progression)
in alt (English)
octave above the treble staff, G_{5} to G_{6}
in altissimo
Octave above the in alto octave, G_{6} to G_{7}
in modo di
In the art of, in the style of
in stand
An instruction to brass players to direct the bell of their instrument into the music stand, instead of up and toward the audience, thus muting the sound but without changing the timbre as a mute would
incalzando
Getting faster and louder
innig (Ger.)
Intimate, heartfelt
insistendo
Insistently, deliberately
intimo
Intimate
intro
Opening section of a piece
irato
Angry
-issimamente
The adverbial form of the superlative suffix (e.g. leggerissimamente, meaning extremely lightly)
-issimo
A suffix for superlative (e.g. fortissimo or prestissimo)
izq. or iz. (Spa.)
Left (hand); abbreviation of izquierda

== J ==
Jazz standard (or simply "standard")
A well-known composition from the jazz repertoire which is widely played and recorded.
jete (Fr. jeté)
Jump; a bowing technique in which the player is instructed to let the bow bounce or jump off the strings.

== K ==
keyboardist (Eng.)
A musician who plays any instrument with a keyboard. In Classical music, this may refer to instruments such as the piano, pipe organ, harpsichord, and so on. In a jazz or popular music context, this may refer to instruments such as the piano, electric piano, synthesizer, Hammond organ, and so on.
Klangfarbenmelodie (Ger.)
"Tone-color melody", distribution of pitch or melody among instruments, varying timbre
kräftig (Ger.)
Strong

== L ==
lacrimoso or lagrimoso
Tearful (i.e. sad)
laissez vibrer, l.v. (Fr.)
French for lasciare vibrare ("let vibrate")
lamentando
Lamenting, mournfully
lamentoso
Lamenting, mournfully
langsam (Ger.)
Slowly
largamente
Broadly (i.e. slowly) (same as largo)
larghetto
Somewhat slow; not as slow as largo
larghezza
Broadness; con larghezza: with broadness; broadly
larghissimo
Very slow; slower than largo
largo
Broad (i.e. slow)
lasciare suonare
"Let ring", meaning allow the sound to continue, do not damp; used frequently in harp or guitar music, occasionally in piano or percussion. Abbreviated "lasc. suon."
leap or skip
A melodic interval greater than a major 2nd, as opposed to a step. Melodies which move by a leap are called "disjunct". Octave leaps are not uncommon in florid vocal music.
lebhaft (Ger.)
Briskly, lively
legato
Joined (i.e. smoothly, in a connected manner) (see also articulation)
leggiadro
Pretty, graceful
leggierissimo
Very light and delicate
leggiero or leggiermente
Light or lightly (the different forms of this word, including leggierezza, "lightness", are spelled without the i in modern Italian, i.e. leggero, leggerissimo, leggermente, leggerezza.)
leidenschaftlich(er) (Ger.)
(More) passionately
lent (Fr.)
Slow
lentando
Gradual slowing and softer
lentissimo
Very slow
lento
Slow
liberamente
Freely
libero
Free
lilt
A jaunty rhythm
l'istesso, l'istesso tempo, or lo stesso tempo
The same tempo, despite changes of time signature, see metric modulation
lo stesso
The same; applied to the manner of articulation, tempo, etc.
loco
[in] place, i.e. perform the notes at the pitch written, generally used to cancel an 8va or 8vb direction; in string music, also used to indicate return to normal playing position (see Playing the violin)
long accent
Hit hard and keep full value of note (>)
lontano
Distant, far away
lugubre
Lugubrious, mournful
luminoso
Luminous
lunga
Long (often applied to a fermata)
lusingando, lusinghiero
Coaxingly, flatteringly, caressingly

== M ==
ma
But
ma non tanto
But not much
ma non troppo
But not too much
maestoso
Majestic, stately
maggiore
The major key
magico
Magical
magnifico
Magnificent
main droite (Fr.)
[played with the] right hand (abbreviation: MD or m.d.)
main gauche (Fr.)
[played with the] left hand (abbreviation: MG or m.g.)
malinconico
Melancholic
mancando
Dying away
mano destra
[played with the] right hand (abbreviation: MD or m.d.)
mano izquierda (Spa.)
[played with the] left hand (abbreviation: m.iz.)
mano sinistra
[played with the] left hand (abbreviation: MS or m.s.)
marcatissimo
With much accentuation
marcato, marc.
Marked (i.e. with accentuation, execute every note as if it were to be accented)
marcia
A march; alla marcia means in the manner of a march
martellato
Hammered out
marziale
Martial, solemn and fierce
mäßig (Ger.)
(sometimes given as "mässig", "maessig") Moderately
MD
See mano destra or main droite
measure
Also "bar": the period of a musical piece that encompasses a complete cycle of the time signature (e.g. in 4/4 time, a measure has four quarter note beats)
medesimo tempo
Same tempo, despite changes of time signature
medley
Piece composed from parts of existing pieces, usually three, played one after another, sometimes overlapping.
melancolico
Melancholic
melisma
The technique of changing the note (pitch) of a syllable of text while it is being sung
meno
Less; see mosso, for example, meno mosso
messa di voce
In singing, a controlled swell (i.e. crescendo then diminuendo, on a long held note, especially in Baroque music and in the bel canto period)
mesto
Mournful, sad
meter or metre
The pattern of a music piece's rhythm of strong and weak beats
mezza voce
Half voice (i.e. with subdued or moderated volume)
mezzo
Half; used in combinations like mezzo forte (mf), meaning moderately loud
mezzo forte (mf)
Half loudly (i.e. moderately loudly). See dynamics.
mezzo piano (mp)
Half softly (i.e. moderately soft). See dynamics.
mezzo-soprano
A female singer with a range usually extending from the A below middle C to the F an eleventh above middle C. Mezzo-sopranos generally have a darker vocal tone than sopranos, and their vocal range is between that of a soprano and that of a contralto.
MG
See main gauche
minore
Minor key
misterioso
Mysterious
mit Dämpfer (Ger.)
With a mute
M.M.
Metronome Marking. Formerly "Mälzel Metronome."
mobile
Mobile, changeable
mode
Type and characteristic of a musical scale
moderato
Moderate; often combined with other terms, usually relating to tempo; for example, allegro moderato
modéré (Fr.)
Moderate
modesto
Modest
modulation
The act or process of changing from one key (tonic, or tonal center) to another. This may or may not be accompanied by a change in key signature.
Moll (Ger.)
minor; used in key signatures as, for example, a-Moll (A minor), b-Moll (B♭ minor), or h-Moll (B minor); see also Dur (major)
molto
Very
mordent
Rapid single alternation of a note with the note immediately below or above it in the scale, sometimes further distinguished as lower mordent and upper mordent.
morendo
Dying (i.e. dying away in dynamics, and perhaps also in tempo)
mosso
Moved, moving; used with a preceding più or meno, for faster or slower respectively
motif
The smallest structural unit possessing thematic identity
moto
Motion; usually seen as con moto, meaning with motion or quickly
movement
A section of a musical composition (such as a sonata or concerto)
MS
See mano sinistra
munter (Ger.)
Lively
Musette (Fr.)
A dance or tune of a drone-bass character, originally played by a musette
muta [in...]
Change [to...]: an instruction either to change instrument (e.g. flute to piccolo, horn in F to horn in B♭) or to change tuning (e.g. guitar muta 6 in D). Note: muta comes from the Italian verb mutare (to change); therefore it does not mean "mute", for which con sordina or con sordino is used.

== N ==
nach und nach (Ger.)
Literally "more and more" with an increasing feeling. Ex. "nach und nach belebter und leidenschaftlicher" (with increasing animation and passion)
narrante
Narrating
natural
A symbol (♮) that cancels the effect of a sharp or a flat
naturale (nat.)
Natural (i.e. discontinue a special effect, such as col legno, sul tasto, sul ponticello, or playing in harmonics)
N.C.
No chord, written in the chord row of music notation to show there is no chord being played, and no implied harmony
Nebenstimme (Ger.)
Secondary part (i.e. a secondary contrapuntal part, always occurring simultaneously with, and subsidiary to, the Hauptstimme)
nicht (Ger.)
Not
niente
"nothing", barely audible, dying away, sometimes indicated with a dynamic n
nobile or nobilmente (Ital.) or Noblement (Fr.)
In a noble fashion
noblezza
Nobility
nocturne (Fr.)
A piece written for the night
notes inégales (Fr.)
Unequal notes; a principally Baroque performance practice of applying long-short rhythms to pairs of notes written as equal; see also swung note
notturno
See nocturne.
number opera
An opera consisting of "numbers" (e.g. arias, intermixed with recitative)

== O ==
obbligato
Bound, constrained
octave
Interval between one musical pitch and another with half or double its frequency. Twelve semitones equal an octave, so do the first and the eighth (hence "oct"ave) note in a major or minor scale.
ohne Dämpfer (Ger.)
Without a mute
omaggio
Homage, celebration
one-voice-per-part (OVPP)
The practice of using solo voices on each musical line or part in choral music.
ordinario (ord.) (Ital.) or position ordinaire (Fr.)
In bowed string music, an indication to discontinue extended techniques such as sul ponticello, sul tasto or col legno, and return to normal playing. The same as "naturale".
organ trio
In jazz or rock, a group of three musicians which includes a Hammond organ player and two other instruments, often an electric guitar player and a drummer.
oppure or ossia (Ital.)
Or (giving an alternative way of performing a passage, which is marked with a footnote, additional small notes, or an additional staff)
ostinato
Obstinate, persistent (i.e. a short musical pattern that is repeated throughout an entire composition or portion of a composition)
ottava
Octave (e.g. ottava bassa: an octave lower)
ouverture (Fr.)
see Overture
oversinging
Vocal styles that dominate the music they are performed in
overture
An orchestral composition forming the prelude or introduction to an opera, oratorio, etc.

== P ==
parlando or parlante
Lit. speaking; like speech, enunciated
Partitur (Ger.)
Full orchestral score
passionato
Passionate
pastorale
In a pastoral style, peaceful and simple
patetico
Passionate, emotional. A related term is Pathetique: a name attributed to certain works with an emotional focus such as Tchaikovsky's 6th symphony.
pausa
rest
pedale or ped
In piano scores, this instructs the player to press the damper pedal to sustain the note or chord being played. The player may be instructed to release the pedal with an asterisk marking (*). In organ scores, it tells the organist that a section is to be performed on the bass pedalboard with the feet.
pensieroso
Thoughtfully, meditatively
perdendosi
Dying away; decrease in dynamics, perhaps also in tempo
pesante
Heavy, ponderous
peu à peu (Fr.)
Little by little
pezzo
A composition
piacevole
Pleasant, agreeable
piangendo
Literally 'crying' (used in Liszt's La Lugubre Gondola no. 2).
piangevole
Plaintive
pianissimo (pp)
very gently (i.e. perform very softly, even softer than piano). This convention can be extended; the more ps that are written, the softer the composer wants the musician to play or sing, thus ppp (pianissimissimo) would be softer than pp. Dynamics in a piece should be interpreted relative to the other dynamics in the same piece. For example, pp should be executed very softly, but if ppp is found later in the piece, pp should be markedly louder than ppp. More than three ps (ppp) or three fs (fff) are uncommon.
piano (p)
Gently (i.e. played or sung softly) (see dynamics)
piano-vocal score
The same as a vocal score, a piano arrangement along with the vocal parts of an opera, cantata, or similar
Picardy third
A Picardy third, Picardy cadence (ˈpɪkərdi ) or, in French, tierce picarde is a harmonic device used in Western classical music. It refers to the use of a major chord of the tonic at the end of a musical section that is either modal or in a minor key.
piatti
Cymbals, generally meaning a pair of orchestral clashed cymbals
piena
Full, as, for example, a voce piena = "in full voice"
pietoso
Pitiful, piteous
più
More; see mosso
piuttosto
Rather, somewhat (e.g. allegro piuttosto presto)
pizzicato
Pinched, plucked (i.e. in music for bowed strings, plucked with the fingers as opposed to played with the bow; compare arco, which is inserted to cancel a pizzicato instruction; in music for guitar, to mute the strings by resting the palm on the bridge, simulating the sound of pizz. of the bowed string instruments)
plop
In jazz, a note that slides to an indefinite pitch chromatically downwards
pochettino or poch.
Very little; diminutive of poco
pochissimo or pochiss.
Very little; superlative of poco
poco
A little, as in poco più allegro (a little faster)
poco rall
a gradual decrease in speed
poco a poco
Little by little
poetico
Poetic discourse
poi
Then, indicating a subsequent instruction in a sequence; diminuendo poi subito fortissimo, for example: getting softer then suddenly very loud
pomposo
Pompous, ceremonious
ponticello or sul ponticello (pont.)
On the bridge (i.e. in string playing, an indication to bow or to pluck very near to the bridge, producing a characteristic glassy sound, which emphasizes the higher harmonics at the expense of the fundamental); the opposite of sul tasto
portamento
Carrying (i.e. 1. generally, sliding in pitch from one note to another, usually pausing just above or below the final pitch, then sliding quickly to that pitch. If no pause is executed, then it is a basic glissando; or 2. in piano music, an articulation between legato and staccato, like portato)
portato or louré
Carried (i.e. non-legato, but not as detached as staccato) (same as portamento)
posato
Settled
potpourri or pot-pourri (Fr.)
Potpourri (as used in other senses in English) (i.e. a kind of musical form structured as ABCDEF... etc.; the same as medley or, sometimes, fantasia)
precipitato
Precipitately
prelude, prélude (Fr.), preludio (It), praeludium (Lat.), präludium (Ger.)
A musical introduction to subsequent movements during the Baroque era (1600s/17th century). It can also be a movement in its own right, which was more common in the Romantic era (mid-1700s/18th century)
prestissimo
Extremely quickly, as fast as possible
presto
Very quickly
prima or primo (the masculine form)
First
prima donna
Leading female singer in an opera company
prima volta
The first time; for example prima volta senza accompagnamento (the first time without accompaniment)

== Q ==
quartal
Composed of the musical interval of the fourth; as in quartal harmony
quarter tone
Half of a semitone; a pitch division not used in most Western music notation, except in some contemporary art music or experimental music. Quarter tones are used in Western popular music forms such as jazz and blues and in a variety of non-Western musical cultures.
quasi (Latin and Italian)
Almost (e.g. quasi recitativo almost a recitative in an opera, or quasi una fantasia almost a fantasia)
quintal
Composed of the musical interval of the fifth; as in quintal harmony

== R ==
rallentando or rall.
Broadening of the tempo (often not discernible from ritardando); progressively slower
rapide (Fr.)
Fast
rapido
Fast
rasch (Ger.)
Fast
rasgueado (Spa.)
(on the guitar) to play strings with the back of the fingernail; esp. to fan the strings rapidly with the nails of multiple fingers
ravvivando
Quickening (lit. 'reviving'), as in "ravvivando il tempo", returning to a faster tempo that occurred earlier in the piece
recitativo
Recitative (lyrics not to be sung but to be recited, imitating the natural inflections of speech)
religioso
Religious
repente
Suddenly
reprise
Repetition of a phrase or verse; return to the original theme
restez (Fr.)
Stay in position, i.e., do not shift (string instruments)
retenu (Fr.)
Hold back; same as the Italian ritenuto (see below)
ridicolo
Ridiculous, comical
riff
a repeated chord progression or refrain
rilassato
Relaxed
rinforzando (rf, rfz or rinf.)
Reinforcing (i.e. emphasizing); sometimes like a sudden crescendo, but often applied to a single note or brief phrase
risoluto
Resolute
rit.
An abbreviation for ritardando; also an abbreviation for ritenuto
ritardando, ritard., rit.
Slowing down; decelerating; opposite of accelerando
ritenuto, riten., rit.
Suddenly slower, held back (usually more so but more temporarily than a ritardando, and it may, unlike ritardando, apply to a single note); opposite of accelerato
ritmico
Rhythmical
ritmo
Rhythm (e.g. ritmo di # battute meaning a rhythm of # measures)
ritornello
A recurring passage
rolled chord
See Arpeggio
rondo
A musical form in which a certain section returns repeatedly, interspersed with other sections: ABACA is a typical structure or ABACABA
round
A musical form in which multiple voices sing exactly the same melody, but with each voice beginning at different times
roulade (Fr.)
A rolling (i.e. a florid vocal phrase)
rubato
Stolen, robbed (i.e. flexible in tempo), applied to notes within a musical phrase for expressive effect
ruhig (Ger.)
Calm, peaceful
run
A rapid series of ascending or descending musical notes which are closely spaced in pitch forming a scale, arpeggio, or other such pattern. See: Fill (music) and Melisma.
ruvido
Rough

== S ==
saltando
Lit. "jumping": bouncing the bow as in a staccato arpeggio
sanft (Ger.)
Gently
sans nuances (Fr.)
Without shades, with no subtle variations
sans presser (Fr.)
Without rushing
sans rigueur (Fr.)
Without strictness, freely
scale
Ascending or descending sequence of musical tones
scatenato
Unchained, wild
scherzando, scherzoso
Playfully
scherzo
A light, "joking" or playful musical form, originally and usually in fast triple metre, often replacing the minuet in the later Classical period and the Romantic period, in symphonies, sonatas, string quartets and the like; in the 19th century some scherzi were independent movements for piano, etc.
schleppend, schleppen (Ger.)
In a dragging manner, to drag; usually nicht schleppen ("don't drag"), paired with nicht eilen ("don't hurry") in Gustav Mahler's scores
schlicht (Ger.)
Plain, simple
schnell (Ger.)
Fast
schneller (Ger.)
Faster
schmerzlich (Ger.)
Sorrowful
schwer (Ger.)
Heavy
schwungvoll (Ger.)
Lively, swinging, bold, spirited
scioltezza
Fluency, agility (used in con scioltezza)
sciolto
Fluent, agile
scordatura
Altered or alternative tuning used for the strings of a string instrument
scorrendo, scorrevole
Gliding from note to note
secco (sec) (Fr.)
Dry (sparse accompaniment, staccato, without resonance); with basso continuo accompaniment for recitativo, this often means that a chordal instrument will play, along with one or more sustained bass instruments. This is in contrast to accompagnato recitativo, which involves the use of continuo and other instruments with their own obbligato parts.
segno
sign, usually Dal segno (see above) "from the sign", indicating a return to the point marked by
segue
Lit. "it follows"; to be carried on to the next section without a pause
sehr (Ger.)
Very
sehr ausdrucksvoll (Ger.)
Very expressive
sehr getragen (Ger.)
Very sustained
semitone
The smallest pitch difference between notes in most Western music (e.g. F–F♯). (Note: some contemporary music, non-Western music, blues, or jazz may use microtonal divisions smaller than a semitone.)
semplice
Simple
sempre
Always
sentimento
Feeling, emotion
sentito
lit. "felt", with expression
senza
Without
senza misura
Without measure
senza replica
Without repetition: "when a movement, repeated in the first instance, must, on the Da Capo, be played throughout without repetition."
senza sordina or senza sordine (plural)
Without the mute. See sordina.
serioso
Seriously
serrez (Fr.)
Getting faster
sforzando (sf or sfz)
Getting louder with a sudden strong accent
sfogato
Vented, let loose, unburdened (notably used in Chopin's Barcarolle Op. 60)
shake
A jazz term describing a trill between one note and its minor third; or, with brass instruments, between a note and its next overblown harmonic
sharp
A symbol (♯) that raises the pitch of the note by a semitone; also an adjective to describe a singer or musician performing a note in which the intonation is somewhat too high in pitch
short accent
Hit the note hard and short (^)
si (Fr.)
Seventh note of the series ut, re, mi, fa, sol, la, si, in fixed-doh solmization; also used for the 5th note, sol, when sharpened, in solmization.
siciliana
A Sicilian dance in 12/8 or 6/8 meter
sign
See segno
silenzio
Silence (i.e. without reverberations)
simile
Similar (i.e. continue applying the preceding directive, whatever it was, to the following passage)
sipario
Curtain (stage)
slancio
Momentum, con slancio: with momentum; with enthusiasm
slargando or slentando
Becoming broader or slower (that is, becoming more largo or more lento)
slur
A symbol in Western musical notation (generally a curved line placed over the notes) indicating that the notes it embraces are to be played without separation (that is, with legato articulation)
smorzando (smorz.)
Extinguishing or dampening; usually interpreted as a drop in dynamics, and very often in tempo as well
soave
Smooth, gentle
sognando
Dreaming
solenne
Solemn
solo or soli (plural)
Alone (i.e. executed by a single instrument or voice). The instruction soli requires more than one player or singer; in a jazz big band this refers to an entire section playing in harmony. In orchestral works, soli refers to a divided string section with only one player to a line.
solo break
A jazz term that instructs a lead player or rhythm section member to play an improvised solo cadenza for one or two measures (sometimes abbreviated as "break"), without any accompaniment. The solo part is often played in a rhythmically free manner, until the player performs a pickup or lead-in line, at which time the band recommences playing in the original tempo.
sommo (masc.), somma (fem.)
Highest, maximum; con somma passione: with the greatest passion
sonata
A piece played as opposed to sung
sonatina
A little sonata
sonatine
A little sonata, used in some countries instead of sonatina
sonore
Sonorous (Deep or ringing sound)
sonoro
With full sound
sopra
Above; directive to cross hands in a composition for piano, e.g. m.s. sopra: left hand over; opposite: sotto (below)
sopra una corda or sull'istessa corda
To be played on one string
soprano
The highest of the standard four voice ranges (bass, tenor, alto, soprano)
sordina, sordine (plural)
A mute. Note: sordina, with plural sordine, is strictly correct Italian, but the forms sordino and sordini are much more commonly used in music. Instruments can have their tone muted with wood, rubber, metal, or plastic devices (for string instruments, mutes are clipped to the bridge; for brass instruments, mutes are inserted in the bell), or parts of the body (guitar; French Horn), or fabric (clarinet; timpani), among other means. In piano music (notably in Beethoven's Moonlight Sonata), senza sordini or senza sordina (or some variant) is sometimes used to mean keep the sustain pedal depressed, since the sustain pedal lifts the dampers off the strings, with the effect that all notes are sustained indefinitely.
sordino
See sordina.
sortita
A principal singer's first entrance in an opera
sospirando
Sighing
sostendo (Galician)
holding back (notably used in El Camino Real by Alfred Reed)
sostenuto
Sustained, lengthened
sotto voce
In an undertone (i.e. quietly)
soutenu (Fr.)
sustained
Sprechgesang
"spoken singing", expressionist vocal technique denoting pitched speaking. Used most notably in the compositions of Arnold Schoenberg such as Pierrot lunaire.
spianato
Smooth, even
spiccato
Distinct, separated (i.e. a way of playing the violin and other bowed instruments by bouncing the bow on the string, giving a characteristic staccato effect)
spinto
Lit. "pushed"
spirito
Spirit, con spirito: with spirit, with feeling
spiritoso
Spirited
staccato
Making each note brief and detached; the opposite of legato. In musical notation, a small dot under or over the head of the note indicates that it is to be articulated as staccato.
stanza
A verse of a song
stem
Vertical line that is directly connected to the [note] head
stentando or stentato (sten. or stent.)
Labored, heavy, in a dragging manner, holding back each note
stornello
Originally truly 'improvised' now taken as 'appearing to be improvised,' an Italian 'folk' song, the style of which used for example by Puccini in certain of his operas
strain
a series of musical phrases that create a distinct melody of a piece, also called a "section"; used in ragtime and marches (see Classic rag § Anatomy of a rag strain and March (music)), where they are often repeated
strascinando or strascicante
Indicating a passage should be played in a heavily slurred manner; in some contexts it indicates a rhythmic motion resembling shuffling
strepitoso
Noisy, forceful
stretto
Tight, narrow (i.e. faster or hastening ahead); also, a passage in a fugue in which the contrapuntal texture is denser, with close overlapping entries of the subject in different voices; by extension, similar closely imitative passages in other compositions
stringendo
Gradually getting faster (literally, tightening, narrowing) (i.e. with a pressing forward or acceleration of the tempo, that is, becoming stretto)
strisciando
To be played with a smooth slur, a glissando
suave (Sp.)
Soft
subito
Immediately (e.g. subito pp, which instructs the player to suddenly drop to pianissimo as an effect); often abbreviated as sub.
sul
Lit. "on the", as in sul ponticello (on the bridge); sul tasto (on the fingerboard); sul E (on the E string), etc.
sul E
"on the E", indicating a passage is to be played on the E string of a violin. Also seen: sul A, sul D, sul G, sul C, indicating a passage to be played on one of the other strings of a string instrument.
suono reale
Actual sound; primarily used with notated harmonics where the written pitch is also the sounding pitch
sur la touche (Fr.)
Sul tasto
syncopation
A disturbance or interruption of the regular flow of downbeat rhythm with emphasis on the sub-division or up-beat (e.g. in ragtime music)

== T ==
tacet (Lat.)
Lit. "he/she keeps silent": do not play
tasto, sul tasto or tastiera (tast.)
On the fingerboard (i.e. in string playing, an indication to bow or to pluck over the fingerboard); playing over the fingerboard produces a duller, less harmonically rich, gentler tone. The opposite of sul ponticello.
tasto solo
'single key'; used on a basso continuo part to indicate that only the written notes should be played, without RH chords as normally played by the harpsichordist/organist
tempo
Time (i.e. the overall speed of a piece of music)
tempo di marcia
March tempo
tempo di mezzo
The middle section of a double aria, commonly found in bel canto era Italian operas, especially those of Rossini, Bellini, Donizetti, and their contemporaries as well in many early operas by Verdi. When present, the tempo di mezzo generally signals a shift in the drama from the slow cantabile of the first part to the cabaletta of the second, and this can take the form of some dramatic announcement or action to which the character(s) react in the cabaletta finale.
tempo di valzer
Waltz tempo
tempo giusto
In strict time
tempo primo, tempo uno, or tempo I (sometimes tempo I° or tempo 1^{ero})
Resume the original speed
tempo rubato
"Stolen time"; an expressive way of performing a rhythm; see rubato
ten.
See tenuto
teneramente; tendre or tendrement (Fr.)
Tenderly
tenerezza
Tenderness
tenor
The second lowest of the standard four voice ranges (bass, tenor, alto, soprano)
tenuto
Held (i.e. touch on a note slightly longer than usual, but without generally altering the note's value)
ternary
Having three parts. In particular, a three-part musical form with the parts represented by letters: ABA
tessitura
The 'best' or most comfortable pitch range, generally used to identify the most prominent / common vocal range within a piece of music
tierce de Picardie (Fr.)
See Picardy third
timbre
The quality of a musical tone that distinguishes one tone from another
time
In a jazz or rock score, after a rubato or rallentendo section, the term "time" indicates that performers should return to tempo (this is equivalent to the term "a tempo")
tosto
Immediately
tranquillo
Calm, peaceful
transposition
moving a collection of notes up or down in pitch by a constant interval.
trattenuto (tratt.)
Held back with a sustained tone, similar to ritardando
tre corde (tc)
Three strings (i.e. release the soft pedal of the piano) (see una corda)
tremolo
Shaking. As used in 1) and 2) below, it is notated by a strong diagonal bar (or bars) across the note stem, or a detached bar (or bars) for a set of notes.
1. A rapid, measured or unmeasured repetition of the same note. String players perform this tremolo with the bow by rapidly moving the bow while the arm is tense;
2. A rapid, measured or unmeasured alternation between two or more notes, usually more than a whole step apart. In older theory texts this form is sometimes referred to as a "trill-tremolo" (see trill).
3. A rapid, repeated alteration of volume (as on an electronic instrument);
4. vibrato: an inaccurate usage, since vibrato is actually a slight undulation in a sustained pitch, rather than a repetition of the pitch, or variation in volume (see vibrato).
tresillo (Sp.)
A duple-pulse rhythmic cell in Cuban and other Latin American music
trill
A rapid, usually unmeasured alternation between two harmonically adjacent notes (e.g. an interval of a semitone or a whole tone). A similar alternation using a wider interval is called a tremolo.
trio
1. A composition for three performers
2. A group that plays such compositions
3. The middle part of a ternary form dance (such as minuet) or march
triplet
A rhythmic figure placing three notes in the place of two, usually indicated by the number 3.
triste, tristamente
Sad, wistful
tronco, tronca
Broken off, truncated
troppo
Too much; usually seen as non troppo, meaning moderately or, when combined with other terms, not too much, such as allegro [ma] non troppo (fast but not too fast)
turn
Multi-note ornament above and below the main note; it may also be inverted. Also called gruppetto.
tutti
All; all together, usually used in an orchestral or choral score when the orchestra or all of the voices come in at the same time, also seen in Baroque-era music where two instruments share the same copy of music, after one instrument has broken off to play a more advanced form: they both play together again at the point marked tutti. See also ripieno.

== U ==
un, una, or uno
One or "a" (indefinite article), as exemplified in the following entries
un poco or un peu (Fr.)
A little
una corda
One string (i.e., in piano music, depressing the soft pedal, which alters and reduces the volume of the sound). For most notes in modern pianos, this results in the hammer striking two strings rather than three. Its counterpart, tre corde (three strings), is the opposite: the soft pedal is to be released.
unisono (unis)
In unison (i.e., several players in a group are to play exactly the same notes within their written part, as opposed to splitting simultaneous notes among themselves); often used to mark the return from divisi
uptempo
A fast, lively, or increased tempo, or played or done in such a tempo; it is also an umbrella term for a quick-paced electronic music style
ut (Fr.)
First note of the series ut, re, mi, fa, sol, la, si, in fixed-do solmization

== V ==
vagans (Lat.)
Lit. "wandering": the fifth part in a motet, named so most probably because it had no specific range
vamp
Improvised accompaniment, usually a repeating pattern played before next musical passage. See vamp till cue. See comp and comping (jazz).
vamp till cue
A jazz, fusion, and musical theatre term which instructs rhythm section members to repeat and vary a short ostinato passage, riff, or "groove" until the band leader or conductor instructs them to move on to the next section
variazioni
Variations, con variazioni: with variations/changes
veloce
Fast
velocità
Speed; con velocità: with speed
velocissimo
As fast as possible; usually applied to a cadenza-like passage or run
via
Away, out, off; as in via sordina or sordina via: 'mute off'
vibrato
Vibrating (i.e. a more or less rapidly repeated slight variation in the pitch of a note, used as a means of expression). Often confused with tremolo, which refers either to a similar variation in the volume of a note, or to rapid repetition of a single note.
vif (Fr.)
Lively
violoncello
cello
virtuoso
(noun or adjective) performing with exceptional ability, technique, or artistry
vite (Fr.)
Fast
vittorioso
Victorious
vivace
Lively, up-tempo
vivacissimo
Very lively
vivamente
With liveliness
vivezza
Liveliness, vivacity
vivo
Lively, intense
vocal score or piano-vocal score
A music score of an opera, musical, or a vocal or choral composition with orchestra (like oratorio or cantata) where the vocal parts are written out in full but the accompaniment is reduced to two staves and adapted for playing on piano
voce
Voice
volante
Flying
volti subito (V.S.)
Turn immediately (i.e. turn the page quickly). While this indication is sometimes added by printers, it is more commonly indicated by orchestral members in pencil as a reminder to quickly turn to the next page.

== W ==
weich (Ger.)
Gentle, gently
wenig (Ger.)
A little, not much
weniger (Ger.)
Less
wolno (Pol.)
Loose, slowly

== Z ==
Zählzeit (Ger.)
Beat
zart (Ger.)
Tender
Zartheit (Ger.)
Tenderness
zärtlich (Ger.)
Tenderly
Zeichen (Ger.)
Sign, mark
Zeitmaß or Zeitmass (Ger.)
Time-measure (i.e. tempo)
zelo, zeloso, zelosamente
Zeal, zealous, zealously
ziehen (Ger.)
To draw out
ziemlich (Ger.)
Fairly, quite, rather
zitternd (Ger.)
Trembling (i.e. tremolando)
zögernd (Ger.)
Hesitantly, delaying (i.e. rallentando)
zurückhalten (Ger.)
Hold back

== See also ==
- Glossary of jazz and popular music
- Glossary of Schenkerian analysis
- List of musical symbols
- List of musical instruments
