= List of Italian musical terms used in English =

Many musical terms are in Italian because, in Europe, the vast majority of the most important early composers from the Renaissance to the Baroque period were Italian. That period is when numerous musical indications were used extensively for the first time.

== Italian terms and English translations ==
Italian term	Literal translation	Definition
A cappella	in chapel style	Sung with no (instrumental) accompaniment, has much harmonizing
Aria	air	Piece of music, usually for a singer
Aria di sorbetto	sorbet air	A short solo performed by a secondary character in the opera
Arietta	little air	A short or light aria
Arioso	airy	A type of solo opera or operetta
Ballabile	danceable	(song) to be danced to
Battaglia	battle	An instrumental or vocal piece suggesting a battle
Bergamasca	from Bergamo	A peasant dance from Bergamo
Burletta	a little joke	A light comic or farcical opera
Cabaletta	from copola (couplet)	A two-part musical form
Cadenza	falling	A florid solo at the end of a performance
Cantata	sung	A piece for orchestra and singers
Capriccio	caprice	A lively piece, free in form, often used to show musical skill
Cavatina	small instrumental tone	A simple melody or song
Coda	tail	The end of a piece
Concerto	concert	A work for one or more solo instruments accompanied by an orchestra
Concertino	little concert	A short concerto; the solo instrument in a concerto
Concerto grosso	big concert	A Baroque form of concerto, with a group of solo instruments
Da capo aria	from the head aria	A three-section musical form
Dramma giocoso	jocular drama	A form of opera
Dramma per musica	drama for music	Libretto
Fantasia	fantasy	A musical composition or “idea” typified by improvisation
Farsa	farce	A one-act comical opera
Festa teatrale	theatrical party	A genre of opera
Fioritura	flowery	A highly embellished vocal line
Intermedio	intermediate	A short connecting instrumental movement – an intermezzo
Intermezzo	interval	A short connecting instrumental movement
Libretto	little book	A work containing the words to an opera, musical, or ballet
Melodramma	melodrama	A style of opera
Opera	work	A drama set to music for singers and instrumentalists
Opera buffa	humorous opera	A comic opera
Opera semiseria	semi-serious opera	A variety of opera
Opera seria	serious opera	An opera with a serious, esp. classical theme
Operetta	little opera	A variety of light opera
Oratorio	oratory	Large musical composition for orchestra, choir, and soloists
Pasticcio	pastiche	A musical piece containing works by different composers
Ripieno concerto	padding concert	A form of Baroque concerto with no solo parts
Serenata	serenade	A song or composition in someone's honour. Originally, a musical greeting performed for a lover
Soggetto cavato	carved subject	A musical cryptogram, using coded syllables as a basis for the composition
Sonata	sounded	From c. 1750 onward, a composition for one or two instruments in sonata form
Verismo	realism	A genre of operas with scenarios based on contemporary everyday life

== Musical instruments ==
Italian term	Literal translation	Definition
Campana	bell	A bell used in an orchestra; also campane "bells"
Cornetto	little horn	An old woodwind instrument
Fagotto	bundle	A bassoon, a woodwind instrument played with a double reed
Orchestra	orchestra, orig. Greek orkesthai "dance"	An ensemble of instruments
Piano(forte)	soft-loud	A keyboard instrument
Piccolo	little	A tiny woodwind instrument
Sordun	deaf, dull in sound	An archaic double-reed wind instrument
Timpani	drums	Large drums
Tuba	tube	A large brass instrument
Viola	viola, orig. Latin vitulari "be joyful"	A medium-sized stringed instrument
Viola d'amore	love viola	A tenor viol with no frets
Viola da braccio	arm viola	A stringed instrument held in the arm, such as a violin or viola
Viola da gamba	leg viola	A stringed instrument held between the legs
Violoncello	smaller large viola	A large stringed instrument
Violone	large viola	A large stringed instrument in the bass or contra-bass range

== Voices ==
Italian term	Literal translation	Definition
Alto	high	Second-highest vocal line
Basso	low	Or "bass;" the lowest vocal line
Basso profondo	deep low	A very deep bass voice
Castrato	castrated	A male singer, castrated before puberty so as to be able to sing soprano (now sung by women, conventional countertenors, or sopranisti)
Coloratura soprano	colouring soprano	A soprano specialised in complex, ornamented melody
Contralto	against high	Alto, esp. a female alto
Falsetto	little false	A vocal register immediately above the modal voice range
Falsettone		Falsetto, sung using the usual techniques of modal voice register
Leggiero tenor		See tenore di grazia
Musico	musician	Originally, a trained musician; later, a castrato or female singer
Mezzo-soprano	middle-upper	Between soprano and alto
Passaggio	crossing	A vocal range
Soprano	upper	The highest vocal line
Soprano sfogato	unlimited soprano	A soprano who has extended her upper range beyond the usual range of a soprano
Spinto	pushed	A forceful voice, between the lyric and dramatic in weight
Spinto soprano	pushed soprano	A soprano whose voice, while normally of lyric weight and fluidity, can be pushed to a more forceful weight
Squillo	ringing	The resonant clarity of an operatic singer's voice
Tenore contraltino		A tenor voice capable of a slightly higher range of sustainable notes than usual
Tenore di grazia or Leggiero tenor	tenor of grace or lightweight tenor	A lightweight, flexible tenor voice
Tessitura	texture	A singer's comfortable range

== Tempo ==
Italian term	Literal translation	Definition
Accelerando	accelerating	Accelerating
Accompagnato	accompanied	The accompaniment must follow the singer who can speed up or slow down at will.
Adagio	ad agio, at ease	Slow and easy (but not as slow as largo)
Adagietto	a bit at ease	1. Slightly less easy than adagio (so slightly faster); 2. a short adagio composition
Affrettando	becoming hurried	Accelerating
Alla marcia	as a march	In strict tempo at a marching pace (e.g. 120 BPM)
Allargando	broadening	Slowing down and broadening; becoming more stately and majestic, possibly louder
Allegro	joyful; lively and fast	Joyful; moderately fast tempo
Allegretto	a little bit joyful	Slightly less joyful than allegro (so slightly slower tempo)
Andante	walking	At a walking pace; flowing; moderately slow tempo
Andantino	a little bit walking	Less of a walking pace than andante (so slightly quicker)
A tempo	to time	Return to previous tempo
Fermata	held, stopped, orig. Latin firmo "make firm, fortify"	Holding or sustaining a note
Grave	grave, solemn	Slow and solemn tempo (slower than largo)
Largo	broad	Slow and dignified tempo
Largamente	broadly	Slow and dignified tempo
Larghetto	broad-ish	Slightly less dignified than largo (so slightly faster tempo)
Lento	slow	Slow tempo
Lentando	slowing	Decelerating, slowing down
L'istesso tempo	the same time	At the same tempo
Moderato	moderate	Moderate tempo
Mosso	moved, agitated	Agitated
Presto	prompt, quick; ready for action	Very fast
Prestissimo	very prompt, very quick	Very very fast (above 200 BPM)
Rallentando	slowing down	Decelerating
Ritardando	retarding	Decelerating
Slentando	slowing down	gradually decreasing in tempo
Tardo	slow, tardy	Slow tempo
Tempo	time	The speed of music; e.g. 120 BPM (beats per minute)
(Tempo) rubato	robbed	Free flowing and exempt from steady rhythm
Tenuto	sustained	Holding or sustaining a single note
Vivace	vivacious	Fast and lively tempo (quicker than allegro)

== Dynamics – volume ==
Italian term	Literal translation	Definition
Calando	quietening	Becoming softer and slower
Crescendo	growing	Becoming louder
Decrescendo	shrinking	Becoming softer
Diminuendo	dwindling	Becoming softer
Forte	strong	Loud
Fortissimo	very strong	Very loud
Mezzo forte	half-strong	Moderately loud
Marcato	marked	A note played forcefully
Messa di voce	placing the voice	A style of singing involving changing volume while holding a single note
Piano	gentle	Soft
Pianissimo	very gentle	Very soft
Mezzo piano	half-gentle	Moderately soft
Sforzando	strained	Sharply accented
Stentato	in the manner of Stentor	Loud, boisterous
Tremolo	trembling	A rapid, repetitive variation in the volume or pitch of a note

== Moods ==
Italian term	Literal translation	Musical definition
Abbandonatamente	with abandonment	With abandonment, prioritizing expression before time and tempo
Accarezzevole	caressingly	Caressing, expressive
Acceso	lit up, ignited	Ignited, ardent, passionate, on fire
Affannato	breathless	Anguished, troubled
Affettuoso (or affetto, con affetto)	affectionate, with affect	Loving, tender
Affrettando	hasty, hurried	Hurrying, in a rushing manner
Agitato	agitated	Agitated, restless, excited
Amabile	amiable	Lovely, pleasant
Amoroso	loving	Loving, tender
Animato	animated	Lively, animated
Brillante	brilliant	Bright, radiant
Bruscamente	brusquely	Abruptly, bluntly
Cantabile	singable, songlike	In a singing fashion
Colossale	colossal	Huge, broad, immense
Comodo	comfortable	Comfortable, leisurely, in moderate speed
Con amore	with love	With love
Con brio	with brightness	Bright, vigorous, with spirit
Con fuoco	with fire	Passionate, lively, enthusiastic
Con moto	with motion	Energetic, with movement
Con spirito	with spirit	Vigorous, spirited
Deciso	decisive	Determined, firm, resolute
Dolce	sweet	Sweet, soft
Drammatico	dramatic	Dramatic
Espressivo	expressive	Expressive, with feeling
Feroce	ferocious	Fierce, heavy
Festoso	festive	Merry, jolly, happy
Furioso	furious	Angry, passionate, rapid
Giocoso	jocose, jestful	Playful, spirited
Grandioso	grand	Grandiose, noble, great
Grazioso	gracious, graceful	Graceful, flowing
Lacrimoso (or Lagrimoso)	lachrymose	Grieving, sad
Lamentoso	lamenting	Mournful, sorrowful
Maestoso	majestic	Stately, dignified, broad
Misterioso	mysterious	Mysterious, secretive, enigmatic
Morendo	dying	Dying away, becoming quiet and/or slow
Pesante	heavy	Heavy, ponderous, slow
Risoluto	resolute	Determined, bold, decisive
Scherzando	joking, jestful	Playful, jestful, sportive, lively
Solitario	solitary	Lonely, alone
Sotto voce	under the voice	Subdued, soft, hushed
Sonore	sonorous	Broad, resonant, resounding
Semplicemente	simply	Simply, plainly
Slancio	passionately hurl or fling, lance	Enthusiastic, with momentum
Tranquillo	tranquil, calm	Calm, soft, peaceful
Volante	flying	Free, light, fast

== Musical expression (general) ==
Italian term	Literal translation	Usage
Molto	very; much	Comes before other terms; e.g. molto allegro ("very cheerful")
Assai	very; aplenty	Comes after other terms; e.g. allegro assai ("very cheerful")
Più	more	Comes before other terms; e.g. più mosso ("more moved/agitated")
Poco	little	Comes before other terms; e.g. poco diminuendo ("a little diminishing")
Poco a poco	little by little	"Slowly but steadily." Comes before other terms; e.g. poco a poco crescendo ("increasing little by little")
Ma non tanto	but not so much	Comes after other terms; e.g. adagio ma non tanto ("not quite at ease")
Ma non troppo	but not too much	Comes after other terms; e.g. allegro ma non troppo ("not too joyful")
Meno	less	Comes before other terms, such as meno mosso ("less moved/agitated")
Subito	suddenly, quickly	Comes before or after other terms; e.g. subito fortissimo ("suddenly very loud")

== Patterns within the musical score ==
Italian term	Literal translation	Definition
Lacuna	gap	A silent pause in a piece of music
Ossia	from o ("or") + sia ("that it be")	A secondary passage of music which may be played in place of the original
Ostinato	stubborn, obstinate	A repeated motif or phrase in a piece of music
Pensato	thought out	A composed imaginary note
Ritornello	little return	A recurring passage in a piece of Baroque music
Segue	it follows	A smooth movement from one passage to another with no pause
Simile	similar	Continue applying the preceding directive, whatever it was, to the following passage
Stretto	tightened, strict	In a fugue, the repeating of a motif by a second voice before the first rendition is completed

== Directions ==
Italian term	Literal translation	Definition
Attacca	attach, begin	Proceed to the next section without pause
Cambiare	change	Any change, such as to a new instrument
Da Capo (al fine)	from the beginning (to the "fine")	Abbreviated as D.C., informs the performer to go back to the beginning (capo) (finishing where the part is marked fine).
Dal Segno	from the sign	Abbreviated as D.S., informs the performer to repeat a specific section marked by a sign (segno).
Divisi	divided	Instructs one section to divide into two or more separate sections, each playing a separate part. Often these separate parts are written on the same staff.
Oppure	from o ("or") + pure ("also")	Informs the player of alternative ways to play a passage. See Ossia.
Solo	alone	A piece or performance to be played by a single musician
Sole	Group solo	A piece or performance to be played by a designated group

== Techniques ==
Italian term	Literal translation	Definition
Acciaccatura	crunching	An extra, very fast grace note
Altissimo	very high	Very high
Appoggiatura	leaning, supporting	A type of ornament that creates a "yearning" effect
Arco	bow	Cancels col legno and pizzicato. (In any string passage, arco is usually expected, as it is the "default" approach; it is only ever written at the end of col legno or pizzicato passages.)
Arpeggio	harp-like	A chord with the notes spread out in time (rather than sounded simultaneously)
Basso continuo	continuous bass	Continuous bass accompaniment by chordal instrument(s) and bass instrument(s) (see Figured bass.)
A bocca chiusa	with mouth closed	Wordless humming in a choral piece
Chiuso	closed	Calls for a horn to be muted by hand.
Coloratura	colouration	Elaborate ornamentation of a vocal line
Coperti	covered	Of a drum, muted with a cloth
Una corda	one string, cord	On a piano, played with the soft pedal depressed
Due corde	two strings	On a piano, played with the soft pedal depressed (For why both terms exist, see Piano#Pedals.)
Tre corde or tutte le corde	three strings or all the strings	Cancels una corda
Glissando	gliding, glossing	A sweeping glide from one pitch to another used for dramatic effect
Legato	tied	A series of notes played with a smooth connection between them
Col legno	with the wood	Calls for a bowed instrument's strings to be struck with the wood of the bow (rather than drawn across with the hair of the bow).
Martellato	hammered	Of notes, strongly accented and detached
Pizzicato	pinched, plucked	Calls for a bowed instrument's strings to be plucked with the fingers.
Portamento	carrying	Playing with a sliding of pitch between two notes
Portato	carried	Played in a style between staccato and legato
Sforzando	forcing	Playing with strong, marked emphasis
Scordatura	discord	Alternate tuning (of strings)
Con sordino	with sourdine (mute)	With mute applied, esp. to string instruments
Senza sordino	without sourdine (mute)	With mute removed
Spiccato	separated, distinct; standing out	With a stringed instrument, played by bouncing the bow lightly on the strings
Staccato	detached	A form of musical articulation in which notes are distinct and separated from each other by short gaps
Staccatissimo	very detached	Forcefully exaggerated staccato
Tutti	all	Played or sung by the entire ensemble, rather than by just a soloist or principal player
Vibrato	vibrating	Played with rapid repetitive variation or undulation in pitch
Colla voce	with the voice	(For accompanists) In time with the singer's text, especially when slowing for textual effect

== Roles ==
Italian term	Literal translation	Definition
Banda	band	Small music ensemble used as a supplement to the orchestra in an opera
Comprimario	with the first	Supporting role
Concertino	little concert	Smaller, more virtuosic group of musicians in a concerto grosso
Convenienze	conveniences	Rules relating to the ranking of singers in opera (primo, secondo, comprimario) in 19th-century Italian opera, and the number of scenes, arias, etc. that they were entitled to expect. The convenienze are referred to in the Donizetti opera Le convenienze ed inconvenienze teatrali.
Coro	choir	Ensemble of singers
Diva	divine one (fem.)	Leading female singer
Prima donna	first lady	Leading female role
Primo uomo	first man	Leading male role
Ripieno	refilling or stuffing	The larger group of musicians in a concerto grosso

== Criticism ==
Italian term	Literal translation	Definition
Bel canto	beautiful singing	Any fine singing, esp. that popular in 18th- and 19th-century Italian opera
Bravura	skill	A performance of extraordinary virtuosity
Bravo	skillful	A cry of congratulation to a male singer or performer. (Masc. pl. bravi; fem. sing. brava; fem. pl. brave.) The use of ! after a written expression of "bravo/a/i/e(!)" strongly emphasizes it.

== Musical direction and staging ==
Italian term	Literal translation	Definition
Maestro	master, teacher	Conductor, music director, music teacher; also composer and other eminent musicians and singers
Maestro collaboratore	collaborating master	Assistant conductor
Maestro sostituto	substitute/deputy master	Assistant conductor
Maestro suggeritore	master suggester/prompter	Prompter
Stagione	season	A variety of formal organisation of players and crew in the staging of operas

== See also ==
- Musical terminology
- Sheet music
