= Ballo del Granduca =

17th century musical composition attributed to Jan Pieterszoon Sweelinck

- by Jan Pieterszoon Sweelinck
- Key: G major
- Genre: Chorale with four variations
- Written: 1602–1621
- Duration: about 5 minutes
- Scoring: Solo keyboard instrument

Ballo del Granduca (The Grand Duke's Ball), SwWV 319, is a composition for solo keyboard instrument attributed to Jan Pieterszoon Sweelinck.

== History ==
The composition is based on the theme of a dance of 1589 entitled "O che nuovo miracolo", an intermedio from the comedy Intermedi della Pellegrina, composed by Emilio de' Cavalieri on the occasion of the wedding of Ferdinando I de' Medici to Christina of Lorraine. The theme of the composition, later known as "Aria di Fiorenza" or "Ballo del Granduca", quickly gained renown in Europe and became the basis for at least 128 other songs, contemporary and later.

Inspired by this theme, several composers produced variations, including Adriano Banchieri, Giovanni Girolamo Kapsperger, and Jan Pieterszoon Sweelinck. It is not clear, however, whether the variations on "Ballo del Granduca" attributed to Sweelinck are completely his work.

Because some of his students, such as Samuel Scheidt, added variations to his different compositions (Scheidt and Sweelinck, in Pavana Hispanica, combined a series of alternating variations), some scholars hypothesize that Sweelinck wrote parts of Ballo del Granduca, but Scheidt also contributed.

== Structure ==
The style of the composition is influenced by the two major currents of the period: Italian polyphony and the technique of English virginalists. From the Italian style Sweelinck assimilated the beauty of counterpoint, while from the virginalists he developed the virtuosity of passages, arpeggios, and fioriture (ornamentation). The dance includes a theme (although the score labels it 1e Variatie) and four variations (or five, if we count the theme as a first variation).

The theme of the composition, which forms the basis for the variations, offers the improviser considerable of freedom. It consists of a series of five short musical phrases lasting four beats each, basically in chords, each one concluded by a cadence. The cadences are in G major (the tonic of the piece), C major, A minor, G major, and G major.

The first variation shows several passages for the right hand with eighth notes and sixteenth notes, while the left hand performs an accompaniment in chords with two and three voices. In the second variation the hands are reversed: the right accompanies and the left plays the melody. The third variation contains most of the semicircular passages typical of the Sweelinck style. The piece ends with the fourth variation, the most challenging, where the right hand constantly performs third and sixth chords.

== Sources ==
- Dickey, Timothy. Jan Pieterszoon Sweelinck – Ballo del Granduca, for organ (doubtful; probably by Samuel Scheidt). SwWV 319 at AllMusic. Retrieved 18 October 2018.
- Vidas Pinkevicius (10 December 2011). "Organ Music: Ballo del Granduca by Jan Pieterszoon Sweelinck". Archived from the original on 2019-10-18.
