= Animato =

Animato may refer to:

- Animato!, a now defunct magazine dedicated to animation
- Animato (album), a 1990 album by John Abercrombie
- Animato (film), a compilation of short films by Mike Jittlov
- Animato (music), a musical term

== See also ==
- Animator (disambiguation)
