= Musica poetica (disambiguation) =

Musica poetica is a theory of music in 16th–17th Century Germany, developing "figures" by analogy with rhetoric.

Musica Poetica may also refer to:

- Musica poetica, music theory book by Joachim Burmeister
- Musica poetica, music theory book by Johann Andreas Herbst
- Musica Poetica, Orff Schulwerk compositions by Carl Orff and Gunild Keetman
