= Johann Mattheson =

German composer, critic and lexicographer (1681–1764)

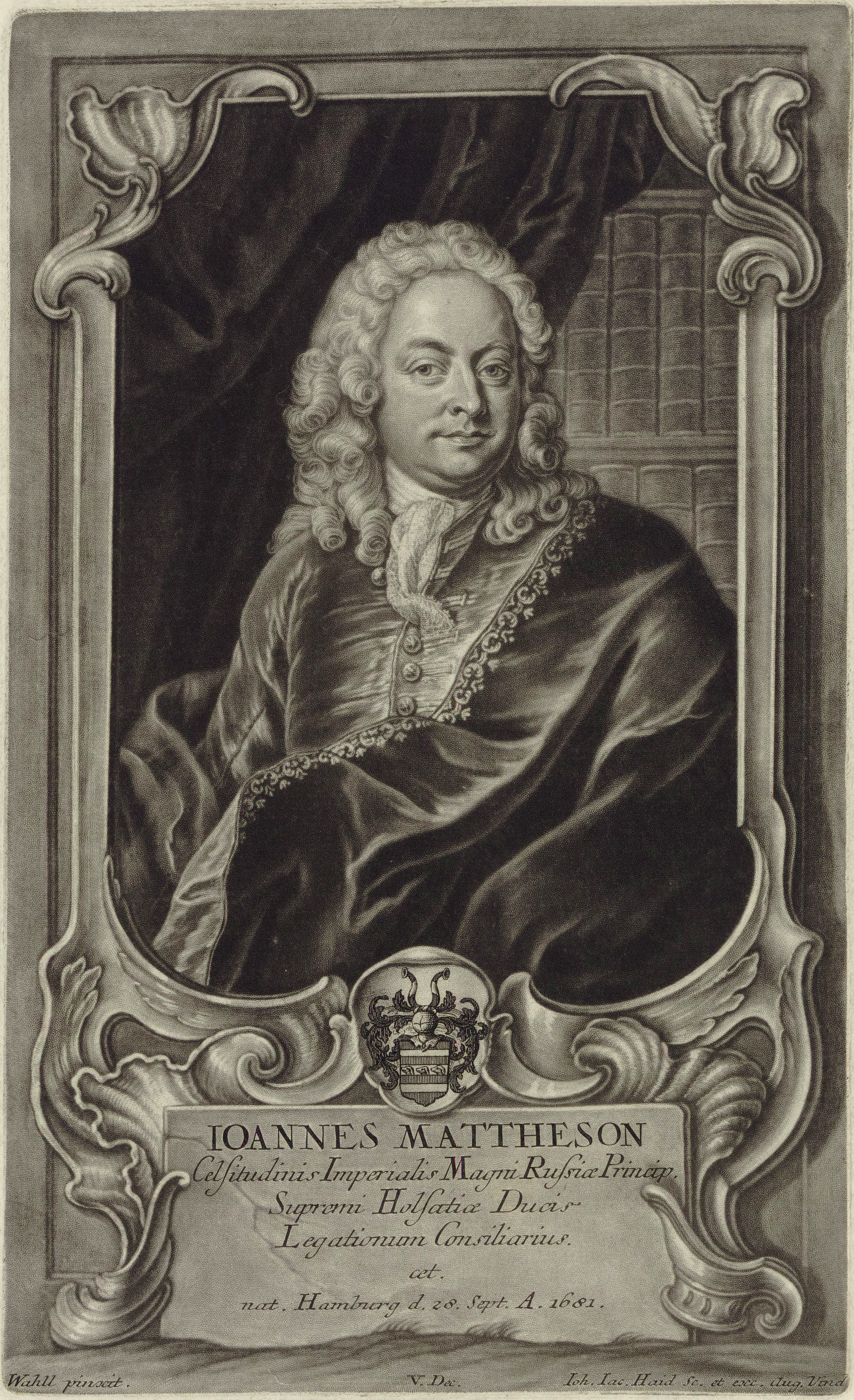
- Mattheson, in a 1746 engraving by Johann Jacob Haid
- Born: 28 September 1681; Hamburg
- Died: 17 April 1764 (aged 82); Hamburg
- Occupations: Composer; critic; lexicographer; theorist

Johann Mattheson (28 September 1681 – 17 April 1764) was a German composer, critic, lexicographer and music theorist. His writings on the late Baroque and early Classical period were highly influential, specifically, "his biographical and theoretical works were widely disseminated and served as the source for all subsequent lexicographers and historians".

== Early life and career ==
Johann Mattheson was born on 28 September 1681 in Hamburg. The son of a prosperous tax collector, Mattheson received a broad liberal education and, aside from general musical training, took lessons in keyboard instruments, violin, composition and singing. By age nine he was singing and playing the organ in church and was a member of the chorus of the Hamburg opera. He made his solo debut with the Hamburg opera in 1696 in female roles and, after his voice changed, sang tenor at the opera, conducted rehearsals and composed operas himself. He was cantor at St. Mary's Cathedral, Hamburg from 1718 until increasing deafness led to his retirement from that post in 1728.

Mattheson's chief occupation from 1706 was as a professional diplomat. He had studied English in school and spoke it fluently. He became tutor to the son of the English ambassador Sir John Wich and then secretary to the ambassador. He went on diplomatic missions abroad representing the ambassador. In 1709 he married Catharina Jennings, the daughter of an English clergyman; they did not have any children.

== Friendship with Handel ==
Mattheson was a close friend of George Frideric Handel, although he nearly killed Handel in a sudden quarrel during a performance of Mattheson's opera Die unglückselige Kleopatra, Königin von Ägypten in 1704. Handel was saved only by a large button which turned aside Mattheson's sword. The two were afterwards reconciled and remained in correspondence for life: shortly after his friend's death, Mattheson translated John Mainwaring's biography of Handel into German and had it published in Hamburg at his own expense ("auf Kosten des Übersetzers") in 1761.

== Death ==
After his death in 1764, Johann Mattheson was buried in the vault of Hamburg's St. Michaelis Church where his grave can be visited.

== Literary and musical legacy ==
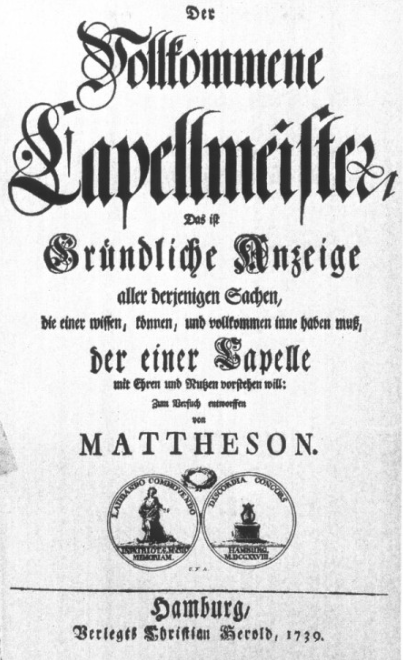
Der vollkommene Capellmeister, Hamburg, 1739

Mattheson is mainly famous as a music theorist. He was the most prolific writer on performance practice, theatrical style, and harmony of the German Baroque. He is particularly important for his work on the relationship between the disciplines of rhetoric and music, for example in Das neu-eröffnete Orchestre, Hamburg 1713, and Der vollkommene Capellmeister, Hamburg 1739. However, his books draw attention also because Mattheson was a brilliant polemicist and his theories on music are often full of pedantry and pseudo-erudition.

The bulk of his compositional output was vocal, including eight operas, and numerous oratorios and cantatas. He also wrote a few sonatas and some keyboard music, including pieces meant for keyboard instruction. All of his music, except for one opera, one oratorio, and a few collections of instrumental music, went missing after World War II, but was given back to Hamburg from Yerevan, Armenia, in 1998. This includes four operas and most of the oratorios. The manuscripts are now located at the State and University Library Hamburg.

== Selected works ==
=== Operas ===
- Die unglückselige Kleopatra, Königin von Ägypten (1704)
- Boris Goudenow (1710)

=== Oratorios ===
- Die heilsame Geburt (1715), Christmas oratorium
- Das größte Kind (1720), Christmas oratorium
- Der gegen seine Brüder barmherzige Joseph (1727), oratorium
- Der liebreiche und geduldige David

== See also ==
- Doctrine of the affections
- Letters and writings of George Frideric Handel
- Musica poetica – music as rhetorical-poetic composition
