= Messa di voce =

Singing technique

Messa di voce [ˈmessa di ˈvoːtʃe] (Italian: placing of the voice) (MDV) is a singing technique and musical ornament most idiomatically on a single pitch while executing a crescendo and diminuendo. It requires sustained control and masterly singing technique. It should not be confused with mezza voce, meaning to sing at half voice or half strength. Messa di voce can also be used as a voice therapy technique.

== Technique ==
The messa di voce is widely considered an advanced vocal technique. To be properly executed, the only feature of the note being sung that should change is the volume, not the pitch, intonation, timbre, or vibrato. This requires an extremely high level of vocal coordination, particularly in the diminuendo.

== History ==
In Western art music, the messa di voce was historically associated with castrati. In the seicento, they performed both sacred and secular music. The papal court employed them in dramatic religious music, sometimes to promote religious conversion, as opera became a distinct genre. Popes and princes hired them from the Sistine Chapel.

In the preface to Le nuove musiche (1602), Giulio Caccini detailed techniques of a new style of singing. He described the messa di voce as a "crescere e scemare la voce" ("crescendo and decrescendo of the voice") and linked it to vocal pedagogy as the main way to master intonation. Its use was expressive, not merely ornamental, technical, or virtuosic.

Domenico Mazzocchi was likely first to mark it in a score. He applied it twice, using the symbol V, in the 1638 Lagrime amare: la Maddalena ricorre alle lagrime of his Dialoghi e sonetti. (Note: Mazzocchi set Mary Magdalene's anointing of Jesus as a lament using a text attributed to Roberto Ubaldini. Athanasius Kircher lauded it as an example of the "metabolic style".) In its three-page "Avvertimento sopra il precedente sonetto" ("Note on the previous sonnet"), Mazzocchi asked for performance "scritto à rigore" ("strictly as written"). With V, Mazzocchi still permitted shifts in pitch, describing the execution as involving a quarter-tone rise in the crescendo. The symbol C, he wrote, denoted "to raise the voice only in volume and spirit". Loreto Vittori may well have performed the Lagrime amare for Urban VIII in 1640. (Note: The music closely fit Gian Vittorio Rossi's account; thus Bonnie Gordon judged its identity as Mazzocchi's Lagrime amare likely. Loreto Vittori was seeking (and obtained) papal pardon for an alleged 1637 abduction.)

By the eighteenth century, Martha Feldman argued, the technique was a castrato hallmark entailing masterly breath control. Having visited Italy, Charles Burney wrote in his 1789 General History of Music that "none of all Farinelli's excellencies ... so far surpassed all other singers, and astonished the public, as his messa di voce, or swell". (Note: Farinelli's messa di voce, Giovanni Battista Mancini observed in his widely translated Pensieri e riflessioni pratiche sopra il canto figurato (1774), made him "eternally famous among singers".) Farinelli's messa di voce inspired disbelief and even suspicion that he was somehow assisted by a musical instrument. Thus music historian Bonnie Gordon argued that the technique was also associated with instruments, to which singers were compared in terms of vocal control.

In singing the roles of castrati (most popularly in Baroque opera), mezzo-sopranos and countertenors later adopted the technique.

It was popular in bel canto opera, often as the opening dramatic flourish of arias. "Casta diva" from Bellini's Norma is a famous example. Verdi's "Pace! Pace, mio Dio", from La Forza del destino, is a later example in the transition from bel canto singing. Messa di voce became less common in the less stylized, speech-like singing of Romantic music of the mid- and late nineteenth century.

In the popular music of the West, messa di voce became even less common. It occasionally featured in some ornate styles, especially gospel and its stylistic descendents.

== Voice therapy ==
Gentle messa di voce exercises are sometimes used to help treat a variety of voice disorders, including nodules and polyps.

== Examples in recorded repertoire ==
- Handel's Alcina, Act II, "Qual portento" (Anna Bonitatibus as Ruggiero, Marc Minkowski conducting Les Musiciens du Louvre, Pentatone 5187084)

== Bibliography ==
- Goldoni, Daniela. 2024. "[Review] Georg Friedrich Händel: Milano - Teatro alla Scala: Alcina". OperaClick: Quotidiano di informazione operistica e musicale. Retrieved 26 March 2024.
- Gordon, Bonnie. 2023. Voice Machines: The Castrato, the Cat Piano, and Other Strange Sounds. Chicago: University of Chicago Press. ISBN 978-0-226-82515-1 (ebk). ISBN 978-0-226-82514-4 (hbk). doi:10.7208/chicago/9780226825151.001.0001.
- di Profio, Alessandro. 2024. "[Review] Parigi, Philharmonie de Paris – Alcina (con Kožená, Bonitatibus, direttore Minkowski)". Connessi all'Opera: Lirica e dintorni ai tempi del 2.0. Retrieved 27 March 2024.
