= Animator (disambiguation) =

An animator is an artist who creates multiple images that give an illusion of movement when displayed in rapid sequence.

Animator may also refer to:

- Animator.ru, a Russian website about the animation industry
- "Animator" (song), a 2006 indie rock song
- Autodesk Animator, a 2D animation and painting program
- Animator (festival), a Polish animated film festival
- Chaplain, an layperson who looks over spiritual care for students; also known as a spiritual animator, faith animator, or pastoral animator
- Ani-Mator, a Marvel Comics character

== See also ==
- Animation
- Reanimator (disambiguation)
