= Reanimation =

Reanimation may refer to:

- Reanimation (facial surgery)
- Reanimation (science fiction), reanimation of the dead, as in Frankenstein
- Reanimated collaborations, a type of collaborative fan-made animation project
- Reanimation (Linkin Park album), 2002
- Reanimation (Lights & Motion album), 2013
- Reanimatsioon, or Reanimation, a 1995 album by Singer Vinger
- Night of the Living Dead 3D: Re-Animation, a 2012 horror film prequel to the 2006 film, Night of the Living Dead 3D

== See also ==
- Reanimator (disambiguation)
- Re-Animated, a 2006 live-action/animated TV movie
- Cardiopulmonary resuscitation (CPR)
- Advanced life support
- Reanimation after nerve damage
- Resurrection (disambiguation)
