= Gallus Dressler =

German composer and music theorist (1533-1580/9)

Gallus Dressler (16 October 1533 – 1580/9) was a German composer and music theorist who served as Kantor in the church school at Magdeburg. Though a few of his works have remained in the choral repertoire, he is best known for his theoretical writings, especially his Praecepta musicae poeticae (MS, 1563), which contains some of the earliest detailed description of the compositional process of the Renaissance motet.

== Life ==
Dressler was born in Nebra in Thuringia, but probably received most of his musical education in the Netherlands. He seems particularly influenced by Clemens non papa, and a perusal of the musical examples he cites in his theoretical writings shows that he was strongly influenced by the Franco-Flemish generation immediately following Josquin des Prez.

After a brief tenure at Jena in 1558, Dressler succeeded Martin Agricola as Kantor of the church school in Magdeburg, where most of his career was spent. His compositions were almost entirely in the genre of the Latin motet, largely ignoring the Lutheran chorale, though he is noted for some of the first German-language motets.

Dressler studied at Wittenberg, receiving the master's degree in 1570, and was closely associated with the Philippists. In fact, when the more orthodox wing of Lutheranism became ascendant in Magdeburg, Dressler left for a position in Anhalt.

== Praecepta musicae poeticae ==
Dressler's chief contribution comes to us in this unpublished manuscript, which from its organization and tone may have been his notes for teaching composition classes. As such it is one of the first sources to give in detail a practical approach to the composition of the Renaissance motet. Dressler's explication of musica poetica can be summarized in two principles: the application of the rhetorical principles of exordium, medio, and finis to the structure of a motet, and the application of the grammatical principle of a "clausula" (sentence) to smaller musical units demarcated by cadences.

The modal aspect of Dressler's musical poetics agrees in principle with that of Pietro Pontio and other contemporary theorists, but Dressler takes it a step further by teaching the use of the principal cadences of the given musical mode (cadences to the final and dominant degrees) to assert stability in the exordium and the finis, and cadences to other degree during the medio to provide contrast and interest.

Dressler's treatise also includes a brief but perceptive sketch in which he identifies four phases in the history of Renaissance music: the John Dunstaple/Guillaume Dufay generation, Josquin des Prez, the post-Josquin generation (dominated, in his mind, by Clemens non papa), and Dressler's own contemporaries.

The Latin text as published by Bernhard Engelke in Geschichtsblätter für Stadt und Land Magdeburg, XLIX-L (1914–1915) is available online through Thesaurus Musicarum Latinarum, but it is somewhat flawed. A new critical text and English translation by Robert Forgacs was published in 2007 by the University of Illinois Press.
