= Francesco Rognoni Taeggio =

Italian composer

Viola Bastarda Diminutions on Susanne ung jour (after Orlando di Lassus)
From Selva di Varie passaggi second l’uso modern (Milan, 1620). Accompaniment arranged for viol consort and performed by Phillip W. Serna.

Francesco Rognoni [of] Taeggio (born in Milan second half of the 16th century – died after 1626) was an Italian composer. He was the son of Riccardo Rognoni and brother of Giovanni Domenico Rognoni Taeggio, both prominent Italian composers and musicians. He was active in Milan, but had connections with royalty from as far abroad as Archduke Charles of Austria, and King Sigismund III Vasa of Poland. Rognoni was a Papal Knight and hereditary Palatine Count. He published both collections of his works and treatises. His most famous work was Selva de varii passaggi, on both vocal and violin technique, and on how to ornament.
