= Henricus Brucaeus =

Heinrich Brucaeus, also Heinrich van den Brock, sometimes falsely Heinrich Brucaeus of Aalst (1530 – 4 January 1593) was a German physician, astronomer and mathematician.

== Life ==
Heinrich Brucaeus was born in Aalst, Flanders as the son of the patron Gerhard van den Brock. He was educated at schools and universities in Ghent, Paris, and Bologna, studied medicine and philosophy, and became a doctor of both disciplines at University of Paris. After that, he worked as a lecturer at the University of Leuven

He worked as a mathematics professor at University of Rome. In 1565, he was employed as a physician of the Maria von Braganza, then joined Rostock Universityas a professor of medicine and astronomy in 1567. This happened, although he was a Catholic. In 1569, 1575, 1581, and 1587, he served as a Rector of the university. He was also a physician of the Duke of Mecklenburg from 1571 onwards.

The professorship was held by Brucaeus until his death on 4 January 1593. Shortly before, he confessed to Lutheranism.

Karl Krause calls Brucaeus a very clever physician and an enormously learned mathematician. Brucaeus knew the work of Nicholas Copernicus, to whom he gave great respect as a mathematician. Probably, Tycho Brahe learned the Heliocentrism by Brucaeus during his study stay at the University of Rostock. Nevertheless, Brucaeus rejected this system according to the consistent opinion of his time.

== Selected works ==
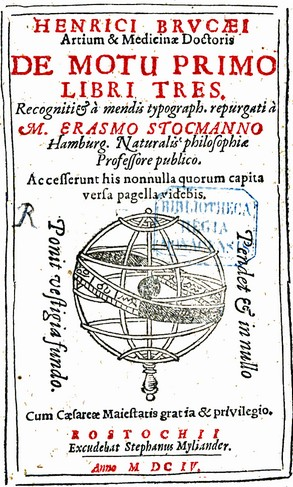
De motu primo libri tres

- De motu primo libri tres. Lucius, Rostock 1573.
- Mathematicarum exercitationum libri duo. Lucius, Rostock 1575.
- Propositiones de scorbuto. Lucius, Rostock 1576.
- De motu primo libri tres. 2. Auflage, Lucius, Rostock 1578.
- Musica theorica. 1609. (von Joachim Burmeister veröffentlicht)
- De motu primo libri tres. 3. Auflage, Myliander, Rostock 1585.
- De motu primo libri tres. 4. Auflage, Myliander, Rostock 1604.
