= Glosa (music) =

Glosa is a term in music which has two possible meanings. In the Spanish language, it's the word used for ornaments in music. Its second possible meaning is to a specific type of music composition from 16th-century Spain that utilized a variation construction similar to that of the Spanish diferencias but within sacred music rather than secular music and with less extensive development. Composers who wrote glosas included Alonso Mudarra, Enríquez de Valderrábano, and Luis Venegas de Henestrosa.
