= Animato (music) =

Animato, sometimes given as anima, animando, or animandosi, or in its French form animé, is a lesser-known musical expression and tempo marking that was used in Western classical music during the 18th and 19th centuries. The word animato is taken from the past participle form of the Italian word animare, meaning "to enliven". The Harvard Dictionary of Music defines the term as meaning "Animating, becoming animated, animated; usually with the implication of (increasingly) rapid tempo." However, Grove Music Online states that the term was interpreted to mean varying things with French theorist Sébastien de Brossard defining the term as synonymous with the tempo marking allegro in 1703. According to musicologist David Fallows, the tradition of increasing spreed in connection with the animato tempo marking was not firmly established until the 19th century.

While a lesser used marking, some well known compositions the contain the animato marking include Leonara's act 1 cavatina from Verdi's Il trovatore (1853), the Dies irae from Verdi's Messa da Requiem (1874), and the second movement of Pyotr Ilyich Tchaikovsky's Symphony No. 5 (1888).
