= Joachim Burmeister =

German composer and music theorist

Joachim Burmeister (1564 in Lüneburg – 5 May 1629 in Rostock) was a German composer, cantor, and music theorist active in northern Germany during the late Renaissance. He is noted for his writings on music as rhetorical-poetic composition (musica poetica).

== Life ==
Burmeister was the eldest of five children born to a beadworker and townsman of Lüneburg. His brother Anton (d. 1634) became the cantor of St. Michaelis, Lüneburg, succeeding Christian Praetorius.

He attended the University of Rostock, where he earned a master's degree, and became cantor at the Nikolaikirche in Rostock and St. Mary's Church, Rostock. He then taught grammar, Latin, rhetoric, and poetry at the Rostock Gymnasium (Scholae Rostochiensis Collega Classicus), where he was acquainted with humanists including Eilhard Lubin, Johannes Posselius (the Younger), Johannes Simonius, and Paul Tarnow.

== Writings ==
In his writings, Burmeister argued for the dignity of music as an art of eloquence. In his treatments of musica poetica, including Musica autoschédiastikè ("Extemporaneous music") and Musica poetica ("Poetic composition in music"), he describes musical solecisms, ornaments, and figures, as well as formal and stylistic categories. He also addresses musical phrasing and rhetorical propriety. His works draw on Greek and Latin sources and cite authors such as Erasmus, Lucas Lossius, and Philip Melanchthon.

== Works ==
- 1601 published a collection of four-voiced psalms.
- 1605 published in Rostock a German-language comedy titled "Christ Revealed" (Χριστὸς πεφασμένος, der geoffenbarte Christus, Comödia), available online.
- 1606 published "Musica poetica," in which he explains his musical-rhetorical figure theory, available online.
- 1609 issued "Musica mathematica" by Heinrich Brucaeus (1531–1593) under the title "Musica theorica".
