= Grace note =

Type of musical ornamentation

Acciaccatura notation

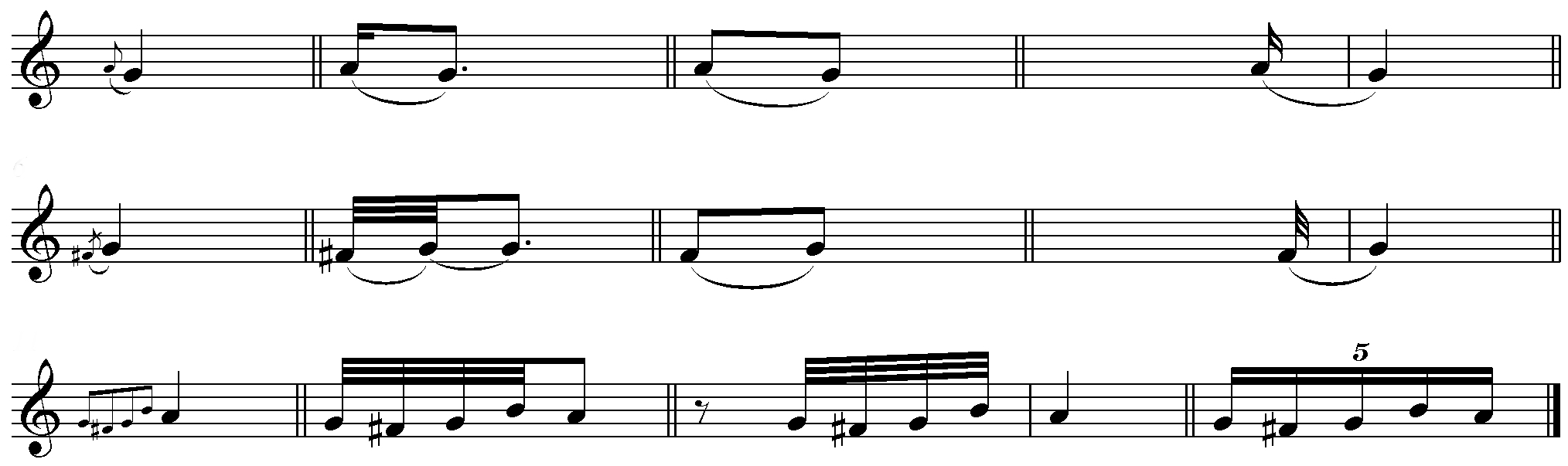
Various interpretations of grace notes

A grace note is a kind of music notation denoting several kinds of musical ornaments. It is usually printed smaller to indicate that it is melodically and harmonically nonessential. When occurring by itself, a single grace note indicates either an acciaccatura when notated with an oblique stroke through the stem, or an appoggiatura when notated without. When they occur in groups, grace notes can be interpreted to indicate any of several different classes of ornamentation, depending on interpretation. For percussion, such as drums, a related concept are ghost notes—supportive snare-hits at a lower volume.

== Notation ==
In notation, a grace note is distinguished from a standard note by print size. A grace note is indicated by printing a note much smaller than an ordinary note, sometimes with a slash through the note stem (if two or more grace notes, there might be a slash through the note stem of the first note but not the subsequent grace notes). The presence or absence of a slash through a note stem is often interpreted to indicate the intention of an acciaccatura or an appoggiatura, respectively.

The works of some composers, especially Frédéric Chopin, may contain long series of notes printed in the small type reserved for grace notes simply to show that the amount of time to be taken up by those notes as a whole unit is a subjective matter to be decided by the performer. Such a group of small printed notes may or may not have an accompanying principal note, and so may or may not be considered as grace notes in analysis.

== Function ==
A grace note represents an ornament, and distinguishing whether a given singular grace note is to be played as an appoggiatura or acciaccatura in the performance practice of a given historical period (or in the practice of a given composer) is usually the subject of lively debate. This is because we must rely on literary, interpretative accounts of performance practice in those days before such time as audio recording was implemented, and even then, only a composer's personal or sanctioned recording could directly document usage.

As either an appoggiatura or an acciaccatura, grace notes occur as notes of short duration before the sounding of the relatively longer-lasting note which immediately follows them. This longer note, to which any grace notes can be considered harmonically and melodically subservient (except in the cases of certain appoggiaturas, in which the ornament may be held for a longer duration than the note it ornaments), is called the principal in relation to the grace notes.

Grace notes are sometimes written as having exactly half the value of the principal note. When there are multiple grace notes, an uncommon view is that their combined values must always equal exactly half of the principal note. (e.g., if the principal note is a quarter note, the grace notes may be notated as an eighth note, two sixteenth notes, four thirty-second notes, eight sixty-fourth notes, etc.)

Grace notes, unlike cue-notes, never affect the rhythmic subdivision, or musical "count" of the bar in which they are contained—and therefore, do not require other notes to be dropped from the bar to keep the time signature intact.

== Use in music ==
There is extensive use of grace notes in music for bagpipes. Because the chanter is not tongued but supplied by a continuous air source from the bag, grace notes are sometimes the only way to differentiate between notes. For example, inserting a grace note between two crotchets (quarter notes) played at the same pitch is the only way to indicate them as opposed to them sounding like a single minim (half note). Various multiple grace note ornaments are formalised into distinct types, such as doublings, throws, and birls. A single grace note is played on the beat as is the first grace note of a complex ornament such as a doubling. Some complex ornaments, such as taorluath can be played starting or ending on the beat. Grace notes are typically played as short as possible by lifting the fingers quickly and a short distance off the chanter.

In modern editions of Western classical music works, editors often seek to eliminate the potential for different interpretations of ornamental symbols, of which grace notes are a prime example, by converting a composer's original ornamental notation into literal notation, the interpretation of which is far less subject to variation. Most modern composers, although not all of them, have followed this trend in the notation of their works.

In the context of Indian classical music (Hindustani (North Indian), Carnatic (South Indian)) some specific forms of notes (swara-s) fulfill the technique of playing a note (swara). Such ornaments in Indian classical music are important for the proper rendition and essential to create the beauty of a raga. Some notes are linked with its preceding and succeeding note; these linked notes are called 'kan-swars' (grace notes). Kan-swars deal with so called 'touch notes' ('sparsh' means "touch" in Hindi (Devanagari). These grace notes (acciaccatura) are often referred to as 'sparsh-swars'. 'Kan-swars' or 'sparsh-swars' can be executed vocally and on instruments in three ways:

1. using a swift short glide (meend or ghaseet),
2. as a 'sparsh' (technique of playing a note on a plucked stringed instrument, the movement of notes is ascending) and
3. as a 'krintan' (the opposite of a sparsh, movement of notes is descending).

In a book on sitar compositions, 'kaṇ' has been defined as "fast deflection which can be approached while descending or ascending". The act of 'kaṇ' being repeated twice, thrice or four times in a single stroke of mizrāb is called 'krintan'.
