= Stentato =

Stentato or stentando (the past participle and gerund of the Italian verb stentare "to find it hard to do something, to have difficulty doing something") is a musical expression which means "labored, heavy, in a dragging manner, sluggish", or "strong and forced". It is abbreviated "sten." or "stent." and is, for example, the direction given for the last 17 bars of the Sanctus of Giuseppe Verdi's Requiem and also used by Ottorino Respighi in his composition Pini di Roma.

Sometimes the term Stentate is used as well (e.g. Marchesi Opus 15, No. 13). This has the same meaning as Stentato or stentando.
