= Reanimator =

Reanimator may refer to:

- Re-Animator (band), British music group
- Re-Animator (album), a 2020 album by British alternative/indie band Everything Everything
- Reanimator (producer), a hip hop producer who is signed to Strange Famous Records
- "Herbert West–Reanimator", a short story by American horror fiction writer H. P. Lovecraft, written 1921–1922
  - Re-Animator, a 1985 film, the first in a series of films based on the H. P. Lovecraft story Herbert West–Reanimator
    - Re-Animator: The Musical, an American rock musical based on the 1985 film
  - Re-Animator (film series), film series based on the writings of H. P. Lovecraft
- "Reanimator", a song by Fields of the Nephilim on the 1987 album Dawnrazor
- "Reanimator", a song by Joji on the 2020 album Nectar
- "Reanimator", a song by Meat Beat Manifesto on the 1988 album Armed Audio Warfare
- "Reanimator", a song by John Zorn on the 1989 album Naked City
- "Reanimator", a song by Amon Tobin on the 1998 album Permutation
- "Reanimator (March of the Undead III)", a song by Machinae Supremacy on the 2006 album Redeemer
- "Reanimator", an episode of the anime Demonbane
- Reanimator (comics), a Marvel Comics character

== See also ==
- Reanimation (disambiguation)
