= Musical expression =

Playing or singing in response to music

Musical expression is the art of playing or singing with a personal response to the music.

At a practical level, this means making appropriate use of dynamics, phrasing, timbre and articulation to bring the music to life. Composers may specify said expressive elements of music to a greater or lesser extent in the notation of their musical score.

The nature of musical expression has also been discussed at a theoretical level throughout of the history of classical music. One common view is that music both expresses and evokes emotion, forming a conduit for emotional communication between the musician and the audience. This view has been present through most of musical history, though it was most clearly expressed in musical romanticism. However, the role of emotion in music has been challenged on occasion by those like Igor Stravinsky who see music as a pure art form and expression as an irrelevant distraction.

== Mimesis and rhetoric ==
In the Baroque and Classical periods of music, music (and aesthetics as a whole) was strongly influenced by Aristotle's theory of mimesis. Art represented the perfection and imitation of nature, speech and emotion.

As speech was taken as a model for music, composition and performance in the Baroque period were strongly influenced by rhetoric. According to what has become known as the doctrine of the affections, a musician was expected to stir feelings in his audience in much the same way as an orator making a speech in accordance with the rules of classical rhetoric. As a result, the aim of a piece of music was to produce a particular emotion, for instance joy, sadness, anger or calm. The harmony, melody, tonality, metre and structure of the music worked to this end, as did all the aspects under the performer's control such as articulation and dynamics.

As Johann Joachim Quantz wrote in 1752,

The orator and the musician have, at bottom, the same aim in regard to both the preparation and the final execution of their productions, namely to make themselves the masters of the hearts of their listeners, to arouse or still their passions, and to transport them now to this sentiment, now that.

Baroque composers used expressive markings relatively rarely, so it can be a challenge for musicians today to interpret Baroque scores, in particular if they adopt a historically informed performance perspective and aim to recreate an approach that might have been recognised at the time. There are some general principles. Looking at the rhythm of a piece, slow rhythms tend to be serious while quick ones tend towards light and frivolous. In the melodic line, small intervals typically represented melancholy while large leaps were used to represent joy. In harmony, the choice of dissonances used had a significant effect on which emotion was intended (or produced), and Quantz recommended that the more extreme the dissonance, the louder it should be played. A cadence normally represented the end of a sentence.

The rhetorical approach to music begged the philosophical question of whether stirring the listener's passions in this manner was compatible with Aristotle's idea that art was only effective because it imitated nature. Some writers on music in the 18th century stayed closely true to Aristotle, with Charles Batteux writing that the sole unifying principle of taste and beauty was the reproduction of the ideal form that lay behind natural things. However, this view was challenged by others who felt that the role of music was to produce an emotional effect. For instance, Sir William Jones wrote in 1772 that: "it will appear, that the finest parts of poetry, musick, and painting, are expressive of the passions, and operate on our minds by sympathy; that the inferior parts of them are descriptive of natural objects, and affect us chiefly by substitution".

In 1785, Michel de Chabanon proposed that music was best understood as its own language, which then prompted an emotional response linked to but not limited by the musical expression. The same music could be associated with a wide range of emotional responses in the listener. Chabanon rejected the rhetorical approach to music, because he did not believe that there was a simple correspondence between musical characteristics and emotional affects. Much subsequent philosophy of music depended on Chabanon's views.

== Romantic era ==
Around the start of the 19th century, the idea of music as a kind of 'ultimate language of the emotions' gained currency. The new aesthetic doctrine of Romanticism placed sublime, heightened emotion at the core of artistic experience, and communicating these emotions became the aim of musical performance. Music was expected to convey intense feelings, highly personal to the vision of the composer. As the 19th century developed, musical nationalism extended these emotions beyond the personal level to embodying the feelings of entire nations.

This emphasis on emotional communication was supported by an increasing confidence in using more complex harmony, and by instruments and ensembles capable of greater extremes of dynamic. At the start of the 19th century, dynamic markings like "pp" and "ff" were most commonly used, but by the late century, markings like "pppp" and "ffff" began to appear on the score. Romantic composers also made increasingly detailed use of expressive markings like crescendos and diminuendos, accents and articulation markings.

== Against expression ==
After the increasing dominance of expression and emotion in music during the 19th and early 20th centuries, there was a backlash.

Stravinsky wrote in 1935, "Most people like music because it gives them certain emotions such as joy, grief, sadness, and image of nature, a subject for daydreams or – still better – oblivion from 'everyday life'. They want a drug – dope - ... Music would not be worth much if it were reduced to such an end. When people have learned to love music for itself, when they listen with other ears, their enjoyment will be of a far higher and more potent order, and they will be able to judge it on a higher plane and realise its intrinsic value."

== See also ==
- Musica poetica
- Musical phrasing
- Philosophy of music
- Tempo rubato
