= Doctrine of the affections =

Theory in the aesthetics of painting, music, and theatre, widely used in the Baroque era

The doctrine of the affections, also known as the doctrine of affects, doctrine of the passions, theory of the affects, or by the German term Affektenlehre (after the German Affekt; plural Affekte) was a theory in the aesthetics of painting, music, and theatre, widely used in the Baroque era (1600–1750). Championed by composers like Johann Sebastian Bach, the doctrine sought to use art to imbue listeners or viewers with a very specific and involuntary emotional response.

Literary theorists of that age, by contrast, rarely discussed the details of what was called "pathetic composition", taking it for granted that a poet should be required to "wake the soul by tender strokes of art". The doctrine was derived from ancient theories of rhetoric and oratory.

== History and definition ==
The doctrine of the affections was an elaborate theory based on the idea that the passions could be represented by their outward visible or audible signs. It drew largely on elements with a long previous history, but first came to general prominence in the mid-seventeenth century amongst the French scholar-critics associated with the Court of Versailles, helping to place it at the centre of artistic activity for all of Europe. The term itself, however, was only first devised in the twentieth century by German musicologists Hermann Kretzschmar, Harry Goldschmidt, and Arnold Schering, to describe this aesthetic theory.

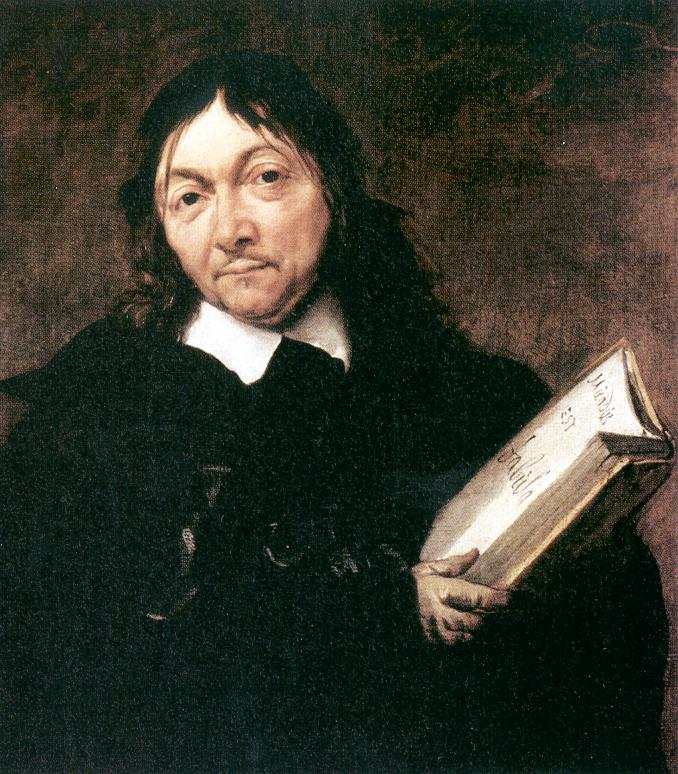
Portrait of René Descartes by Jan Baptist Weenix, 1647–1649

René Descartes held that there were six basic affects, which can be combined into numerous intermediate forms:

1. Admiration (admiration)
2. Amour (love)
3. Haine (hatred)
4. Désir (desire)
5. Joie (joy)
6. Tristesse (sorrow)

Another authority also mentions sadness, anger, and jealousy. These were attributed to the physiological effects of humours. Lorenzo Giacomini (1552–1598) in his Orationi e discorsi defined an affection as "a spiritual movement or operation of the mind in which it is attracted or repelled by an object it has come to know as a result of an imbalance in the animal spirits and vapours that flow continually throughout the body". Descartes also proposed that the affections were reliant upon humors. Contemporary beliefs were that the humours' consistency or location could be affected by external factors. This allowed for an expectation of contemporary art to have an objective physical effect on its consumer.

"Affections are not the same as emotions; however, they are a spiritual movement of the mind".

A prominent Baroque proponent of the Doctrine of the Affections was Johann Mattheson.

== Examples for affects and corresponding musical figures ==
The following table cites instructions from Johann Mattheson on how to express affects.

"Since for example joy is an expansion of our soul, thus it follows reasonably and naturally that I could best express this affect by large and expanded intervals".
"Whereas if one knows that sadness is a contraction of these subtle parts of our body, then it is easy to see that the small and smallest intervals are the most suitable for this passion".
"Hope is an elevation of the soul or spirits; but despair is a depression of this: all of which are things which can very naturally be represented with sound, especially when the other circumstances (tempo in particular) contribute their part. And in this way one can form a sensitive concept of all the emotions and compose accordingly".
"Pride, haughtiness, arrogance, and the like, are also usually depicted or expressed with their special colors in notes and sounds, for which purpose the composer usually draws upon a bold, pompous style. He thus has the opportunity to use all sorts of majestic musical figures which require a special seriousness and grandiloquent motion; but he must never permit a musical line that is fleeting and falling, but always ascending".
"Anger, ardor, vengeance, rage, fury, and all other such violent affections, are actually far better at making available all sorts of musical inventions than the gentle and pleasant passions which are handled with much more refinement. Yet it is also not enough with the former if one only rumbles along strongly, makes a lot of noise and boldly rages: notes with many tails will simply not suffice, as many think; but each of these violent qualities requires its own particular characteristics, and, despite forceful expression, must still have a becoming singing quality: as our general principle, which we must not lose sight of, expressly demands".
"That which is to a certain degree placed in opposition to hope and consequently gives rise to a contrasting arrangement of sounds is called fear, dejection, failure, etc. Fright and horror also belong here, which, if one thinks of them rightly and has a good mental picture of their natural character, yield very suitable musical passages corresponding with the condition of the affections".

== See also ==
- Musica poetica – music as rhetorical-poetic composition
