= Riccardo Rognoni =

Italian composer

Riccardo Rognoni or Richardo Rogniono (ca. 1550 – before 20 April 1620) is the earliest known member of the Rognoni family which started one of the earliest of all violin schools, based in Milan. His treatise Passaggi per potersi esercitare nel diminuire ("Passages for practice in diminution"), Venice 1592, is the first to mention the violino da brazzo, or violin. He was directly involved in taking the violin from a street instrument to court instrument in the Lombard area. Some of his excellent violin pupils include his sons Francesco and Giovanni Domenico.

The noble title Taegio or Taeggio was conferred on the Rognoni family by king Sigismund III of Poland, and appears on the title-pages of works of Rognoni's sons from 1605.

Riccardo writes in the title of the Passaggi that he was expelled from the "Val Tavegia", or Val Taleggio. The records of bloody conflicts between Milan and Venice in the area explain why he arrived in Milan as a Ghibelline fugitive. Paolo Morigia reported that he was "much praised for his playing of the viol and judged among the finest of the City", while Filippo Picinelli in 1670 described him as an "excellent player of the violin and other string and wind instruments, who became the Orpheus of his day."

His Passaggi and only one instrumental work survived: a piece in an anthology printed by Gastoldi: Il primo libro della musica a due voci, Milan, 1598.
