= Accarezzevole =

Accarezzevole Italian: [akkaretˈtseːvole] (Italian: "Caressingly") is a music term that is marked on sheet music to indicate that a piece is to be played in an expressive and caressing manner. Alexander Scriabin was one of the first composers to use this term in his music.
