= Fioritura =

Complex embellishment of melodic lines

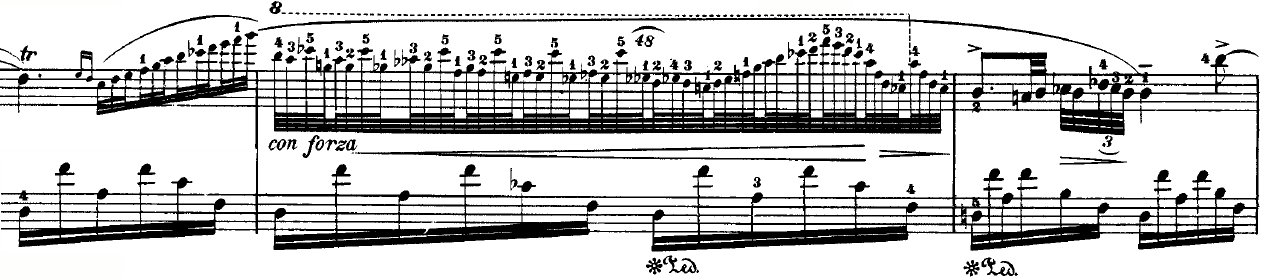
An extreme example of fioritura from Chopin's Nocturne in D♭ major

In music, fioritura (/fiˌɔːrɪˈtjʊərə/ fee-OR-i-TURE-ə, Italian: [fjoriˈtuːra], meaning "flourish" or "flowering"; plural fioriture) is the florid embellishment of melodic lines, either notated by a composer or improvised during a performance. It usually involves lengthy, complex embellishments, as opposed to standardized local ornamental figures such as trills, mordents, or appoggiaturas, and its use is documented as early as the thirteenth century. The alternative term coloratura is less accurate. It is closely related to the sixteenth-century practice of diminution or division.

== Sources ==
- Da Costa, Neal Peres. 2002. "Fioritura". The Oxford Companion to Music, edited by Alison Latham. Oxford and New York: Oxford University Press. ISBN 978-0-19-866212-9.
- Jander, Owen. 2001. "Fioritura". The New Grove Dictionary of Music and Musicians, second edition, edited by Stanley Sadie and John Tyrrell. London: Macmillan Publishers.
- Randel, Don Michael. 2003. "Fioritura". The Harvard Dictionary of Music, fourth edition. Harvard University Press Reference Library 16. Cambridge: Harvard University Press. ISBN 978-0-674-01163-2.
- Steane, J. B. 1992. "Fioritura". The New Grove Dictionary of Opera. 2 vols. London: Macmillan Publishers.
