= Appoggiatura =

Musical ornament

Appoggiatura
A passage with two phrases ending in appoggiaturas, followed by these phrases without them (160 KB)

An appoggiatura (/əˌpɒdʒəˈtjʊərə/ ə-POJ-ə-TURE-ə, Italian: [appoddʒaˈtuːra]; German: Vorschlag or Vorhalt; French: port de voix) is a musical ornament that consists of an added non-chord note in a melody that is resolved to the regular note of the chord. By putting the non-chord tone on a strong beat, (typically the first or third beats of the measure, in 4/4 time) this accents the appoggiatura note, which also delays the appearance of the principal, expected chord note. The added non-chord note, or auxiliary note, is typically one degree higher or lower than the principal note, and may be chromatically altered. An appoggiatura may be added to a melody in a vocal song or in an instrumental work.

The term comes from the Italian verb appoggiare, "to lean upon". The appoggiatura is often used to express emotional "yearning". It is also called a long appoggiatura to distinguish it from the short appoggiatura, the acciaccatura. An ascending appoggiatura was previously known as a forefall, while a descending appoggiatura was known as a backfall.

== Notation ==
The appoggiatura is often written as a grace note prefixed to a principal note and printed in small character, usually without the oblique stroke:

This may be executed as follows:

The same notation can be used for other interpretations of the grace note; therefore determining that an appoggiatura is intended depends on performance practice.

An appoggiatura may also be notated precisely as it should be performed, with full-size notes, to reduce ambiguity.

== Double appoggiatura ==
The double appoggiatura (Ital. Appoggiatura doppia; Ger. Doppelvorschlag, also called Anschlag in German; Fr. Port de voix double) is an ornament composed of two short notes preceding a principal note, one placed above and the other below it. They are usually written as small sixteenth notes.

The first of the two may be at any distance from the principal note, but the second is only one degree removed from it. They have no fixed duration, but are generally slower when applied to a long note (Ex. 1) than when the principal note is short (Ex. 2); moreover, the double appoggiatura, in which the first note lies at a distance from the principal note, should always be somewhat slower than that in which both notes are close to it (Ex. 3). In all cases, the time required for both notes is subtracted from the value of the principal note.

The double appoggiatura is sometimes, though rarely, met with in an inverted form (Ex. 4), and C. P. E. Bach mentions another exceptional kind, in which the first of the two small notes is dotted, and receives the whole accent, while the principal note becomes as short as the second of the two small notes (Ex. 5)

The dotted double appoggiatura, written as above, is of very rare occurrence.

== Appoggiaturas approached by step ==
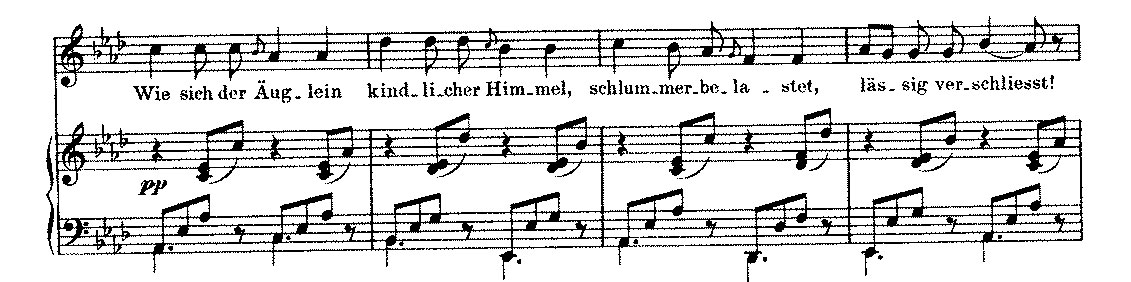
Appoggiatura approached and left by step

Although appoggiaturas are often approached by leap and resolved by step, there are examples of approach and resolution both taking place by step.

One such example is present in Schubert's "Wiegenlied" D. 867:
