= Musica poetica =

Musica poetica was a term commonly applied to the art of composing music in sixteenth- and seventeenth-century German schools and universities. Its first known use was in the Rudimenta Musicae Planae (Wittenberg: 1533) of Nicolaus Listenius. Previously, music had been divided into musica theoretica and musica practica, which were categorised with the quadrivium and trivium, respectively. Since music of the time primarily meant vocal music, it was natural for theorists to make analogies between the composition of music and the composition of oratory or poetry. Hence, the term musica poetica.

Analogies between music and the rhetorical arts were made on several levels. Gallus Dressler (1563) suggested to liken the structure of a musical composition with that of a speech, as outlined in classical sources, dividing it into such sections as exordium, medium, and finis (literally, "beginning", "middle", and "end"). Another kind of analogy was to liken the rules or grammar of composition with those of speech, as illustrated by Joachim Burmeister's use of tautoëpia to label consecutive fifths and octaves (which were generally regarded as illegal except in special circumstances).

Most significantly, though, special melodic, harmonic, or technical devices in music began to be associated with the figures of classical oratory: for example, a rising or falling sequence in music was usually called climax in the literature of musica poetica. However, it must be pointed out that such analogies were not always direct: terms used in musica poetica do not always correspond equivalently to their rhetorical counterparts (for example, in oratory, anaphora means a straightforward repetition of a word, but in music it can denote various kinds of repetitive device, such as the development of a subject through imitation (fugue); also, the presence of a rhetorical figure in the text being set to music did not imply an automatic application of that figure's musical equivalent (that is, it was never mandatory for composers to respond to such verbal ideas as "going up" with rising musical phrases (known as anabasis or ascensus in musica poetica).

A knowledge of both classical rhetoric and musica poetica can greatly enhance the listener's understanding and appreciation of works composed in the sixteenth and seventeenth centuries, especially by such figures as Heinrich Schütz and Giacomo Carissimi. However, it is also important not to seek examples of musical figures on every page; while rhetoric and musical theory were strongly associated, the nature of this association was complex and variable.
