= List of ornaments =

Ornaments are a decorative embellishment to music, either to a melody or to an accompaniment part such as a bassline or chord. Sometimes different symbols represent the same ornament, or vice versa. Different ornament names can refer to an ornament from a specific area or time period. Understanding these ornaments is important for historically informed performance and understanding the subtleties of different types of music. This list is intended to give basic information on ornaments, with description and illustrations where possible. Ornaments are used in Western classical music, Western popular music e.g., (rock music and pop music) and traditional music (e.g., folk music and blues) and in other world music and classical music from the eastern and Southern Hemisphere continents.

== A ==
- Accent can refer to any stressed or emphasized note, such as sforzando. It was used to indicate an ornament until the 18th century. In German Baroque music it occurs in J. S. Bach's ornament tables as a stressed appoggiatura, indicated by a half circle or "C" in front of a note. This ornament was continued in French Baroque ornament tables.
- Accent und Trillo, German, used mainly by J.S. Bach, a trill prepared by an accented note. Generally indicated by a trill sign (jagged line) with a descending line at the beginning.
- Accento (pl. accenti) Italian, a popular vocal ornament, used in the late Renaissance and early Baroque; Lodovico Zacconi and Giovanni Battista Bovicelli, Giulio Caccini was a big proponent of its use. Consists of a dotted figure used to fill in or expand an interval or connect two longer notes. Generally improvised or written out literally.
- Appoggiatura in Italian, in French appoggiature and German Vorschlag. Leaping up or down in pitch to an accented dissonant note, followed by a consonant resolution, generally by step downward. Very common in recitative, particularly in Baroque and Classical music. May be notated or improvised. Often used to express a "yearning" emotion.
- Accentuirte Brechung German, a broken chord with an added passing tone. Used by Bach, described by Marpurg and Kirnberger, similar to the French coulé. Sometimes indicated by a slash between two noteheads.
- Acciaccatura In Italian; French - pincé étouffé; German - Zusammenschlag.
- Andolan is an ornament in Hindustani music that consists of a gentle oscillation of pitch around a musical note
- Arpeggio is a chord that is played or sung one note after the other, rather than all of the notes at the same time.

== B ==
- Bebung is a type of vibrato used on the clavichord, a Baroque music era keyboard instrument.

== C ==
- Cambiata
- Changing tone
- Cran

== E ==
- Echappée

== F ==
- Fall: Generally a Jazz ornament meaning to play a note as written, then descend in pitch without emphasizing specific notes (approximating a downward glissando with no ending pitch).
- Finger vibrato

== G ==
- Gamak: Means "ornamented note", from Sanskrit. Gamaks involve the variation of pitch of a note, using heavy forceful oscillations between adjacent and distant notes.
- Glissando: A glide from one pitch to another.
- Gruppetto: A trill or turn.
- Grace note: Music notation used to denote several kinds of musical ornaments, usually an appoggiatura or an acciaccatura, depending on interpretation.

== L ==
- Legato

== M ==
- Meend: A glide from one note to another in Hindustani music.
- Mordent: Ornament indicating that the note is to be played with a single rapid alternation with the note above or below.

== N ==
- Neighbor group

== P ==
- Portamento
- Pralltriller
- Pull-off

== R ==
- Ribattuta di gola: Trill on a long-short dotted rhythm accelerating to end on either a tremolo or a regular trill.
- Roll
- Rubato: To 'rob' part of the duration from one note and give it to another.

== S ==
- Slide
- Silsulim (Often found in mizrahi music, Silsulim literally translate to "trills" or "twists" in hebrew.)

== T ==
- Timbre
- Tremolo
- Trill German – Triller, Italian – trillo, Spanish – trino, a rapid alternation in pitch, generally from a main pitch and one a step or half-step above or below it. There can be differently-named variations within this general type.
- Turn

== V ==
- Vibrato Italian, a fluctuation in pitch, volume, or both, generally applied to vocal music. Later used for left-hand technique on bowed strings, and with breath vibrato on wind instruments. It is either used constantly or used as an ornament, depending on repertoire. When used as an ornament, it is generally improvised, although some 17th-century English and French sources indicate a dot over a note should be used. Giuseppe Tartini discussed it as one of the four Graces. There are many terms which can be understood to refer to what is now called vibrato. It is believed that vibrato has been used in European music since medieval times, and went through several cycles of popularity.

== W ==
- Warble. A distinctive ornament of some Native American flutes, particularly traditional flutes, that is created by steady breath pressure on the fundamental note of the instrument. A phase shift occurs between different harmonics of the note, an effect that can be observed on a spectrograph of the sound of a warbling flute.
