= Division (music) =

Musical ornamentation; splitting a note into shorter, faster notes

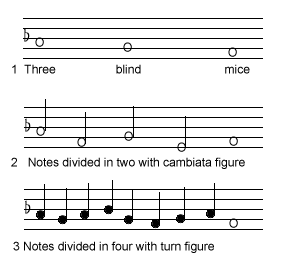
Theme and some possible divisions

In music, division (also called diminution or coloration) refers to a type of ornamentation or variation common in 16th- and 17th-century music in which each note of a melodic line is "divided" into several shorter, faster-moving notes, often by a rhythmic repetition of a simple musical device such as the trill, turn or cambiata on each note in turn, or by the introduction of nonchord tones or arpeggio figures. The English term 'division' broadly corresponds to the contemporary usage of passaggio in Italian, diferencia or glosa in Spanish, and double in French.

The word was used in this sense to describe improvised coloratura ornamentation as used by opera singers of the day, but it made a ready way of devising variations upon a theme, and was particularly cultivated in the form of the "division on a ground" – the building of successively higher and faster parts onto a repeating bass-line. Examples of "divisions on a ground" were written by, among others, John Jenkins and Christopher Simpson. Simpson gives a lengthy explanation of the art of free improvisation over an ostinato bass-line in his book The Division-Violist (1659), which was reprinted in 1665 as The Division-viol, or The Art of Playing Extempore upon a Ground.

== See also ==
- Division viol
- Sequence
- Colotomy
