= Murki =

Murki is a short taan or inverted mordent in Hindustani classical music, known as pratyahatam in Carnatic music. It is a fast and delicate ornamentation or alankar, employing two or more notes and is similar to a mordent or ulta murki. A murki is less forceful than a khatka or a zamzama. A combination like R R S S could be a murki or a khatka or the starting point of a zamzama, depending on the force of delivery. Murkis may or may not be appropriate for a given raga. It is also employed in thumris and other lighter genres.

In Punjab it is also called harkat.

== See also ==
- Alankar
