= Zamzama (disambiguation) =

A Zamzama is an 18th-century large bore cannon.

Zamzama can also refer to:

- Zamzama Park, a public park in Karachi, Pakistan
- Zamzama (music), a note ornamentation in Indian classical music

== See also ==
- Zamzam (disambiguation)
