= Picciola serenata =

1778 composition by Antonio Salieri

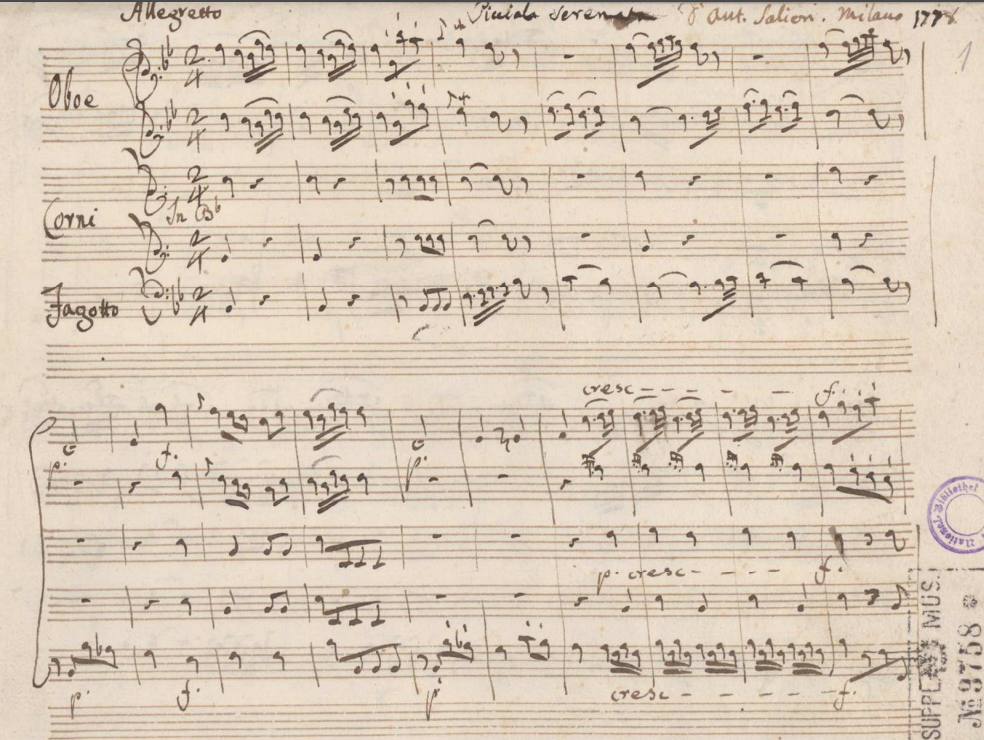
First page of Salieri's Picciola serenata in B♭ major

Picciola serenata (little serenade) in B♭ major is a serenade written by Italian composer Antonio Salieri scored for five instruments: 2 oboes, 2 horns and 1 bassoon. The piece was composed in 1778 and consists of four movements.

== Background ==
Salieri wrote Picciola serenata in 1778. The piece was written at the beginning of his Italian tour, and shortly after he had been appointed the director of the Italian opera in 1774. Salieri's success as a composer was approaching its peak, as his music quietly faded in popularity into the beginning of the 1800s.

It was not until the 20th century that Salieri resurged in popularity because of the depiction of Salieri in Peter Shaffer's 1979 play Amadeus, which was later adapted into the film of the same name.

== Instrumentation ==
Picciola serenata is scored for 2 oboes, 2 horns and 1 bassoon.

== Movements ==
The serenade is in four movements as follows:

1. Allegretto
2. Larghetto
3. Minuetto – Allegro non troppo
4. Presto

=== I. Allegretto ===
The opening movement begins with a stately entrance in B♭ major in which the two oboes present the motive while the bassoon and two horns provide a strong foundation of the tonic chord on the downbeat. In measure 25, the piece modulates to F major, using the same material from the opening. The piece uses strong use of the tonic and dominant chord.

=== II. Larghetto ===
Keeping with the exalted feel of the first movement, the second movement opens with the melody in the horn, the other instruments accompanying with eighth notes in a 6/8 meter. The majority of this movement is in F major, usually and often modulating to the dominant key of C major. The movement ends in the key of F major.

=== III. Minuetto – Allegro non troppo ===
The third movement is a minuet in 3/4, which is very common for a four movement serenade. The movement's tonal center is B♭ major. This movement takes many harmonic and melodic elements from the first two, namely the frequent modulation to the tonic key and chromatic passing tones. Similar to the first movement and unlike the second, the piece uses first and second oboes to carry most of the melodic content, while the horns and bassoon provide harmony and counterpoint.

=== IV. Presto ===
The fourth movement, 'Presto', is the final movement of the piece. Again, we see a lot of the same compositional devices being used here. It frequently plays within the tonic or dominant triad. Towards the end of the movement, there is a cadenza in the first oboe all centered around the V chord of F major, after which the piece returns to the opening material of the movement, ending in B♭ major.

== See also ==
- List of compositions by Antonio Salieri
