= Zamzam =

The Zamzam Well is a well in the Masjid al-Haram in Mecca, Saudi Arabia.

Zamzam or Zam Zam may also refer to:

- Zamzam (given name)
- Zamzam (soft drink), a soft drink produced in Iran
- Zamzam (party), a Jordanian political party
- SS Zamzam, an Egyptian ship sunk by a German auxiliary cruiser in April 1941
- Zam Zam (film), a 2021 Indian Malayalam-language film
- Zichron Menachem (ZAMZAM), an Israeli association for the support of children with cancer and their families
- Zamzam, Libya, a settlement in Sirte
- Zamzam camp, an IDP camp in Sudan

== See also ==
- Zamzama, a cannon outside Lahore Museum, immortalized by Rudyard Kipling in his novel Kim
- Zamzama (music), note ornamentation in Indian classical music
- Zem Zem Springs, California (named after the well)
