= Cambiata =

Pattern in a homophonic or polyphonic setting of a melody

Cambiata, or nota cambiata (Italian for changed note), has a number of different and related meanings in music. Generally it refers to a pattern in a homophonic or polyphonic (and usually contrapuntal) setting of a melody where a note is skipped from (typically by an interval of a third) in one direction (either going up or down in pitch) followed by the note skipped to, and then by motion in the opposite direction, and where either the note skipped from is distinguished as a dissonance or the note skipped to is distinguished as a non-harmonic or non-chordal tone. With regard to music pedagogical activities and species counterpoint, it refers to a more specific set of patterns.

The cambiata is also called changing note in English, though the literal meaning of the Italian is changed note. It is not to be confused with changing tones, which resolve to the original note. The terminology used in other languages (G. Wechselnote, Fr. note de rechange) all of which relate to the concepts of "change" or "exchange".

== In species counterpoint ==
In species counterpoint, the dissonant cambiata can be called an idiom in that it is considered an acceptable pattern even though it breaks a rule, in this case, that of skipping from a dissonance. The dissonance in the dissonant cambiata is approached by descending step and occurs on a weak half or quarter of the beat; the skip from the dissonance must be a descending third to a consonance; and this consonance must be followed by some number of ascending steps. This means there are only three possible essential dissonant cambiatas in third species: Two above the cantus firmus, with vertical intervals 8-7-5-6 (Ex.1) and 6-b5-3-4 (Ex.2); and one below the C.F., with 3-4-6-5 (Ex.3).

Example 1	Example 2	Example 3

The consonant cambiata is not considered an idiom like the dissonant version as it does not break any rules of species counterpoint by itself. There are two consonant cambiatas in third species: One above the C.F., with 6-5-3-4; and one below, with 5-6-8-7. Whereas, when dealing with species counterpoint, the dissonant cambiata is frequently called, simply, cambiata, the consonant cambiata is rarely called cambiata at all.

The inverted cambiata is a cambiata where the melodic movement of the contrapunctus is inverted; where the dissonant cambiata has a skip down a third, the inverted cambiata has a skip up a third, etc. There are both dissonant and consonant inverted cambiatas. There are three dissonant inverted cambiatas in third species: One above the C.F., with 3-4-6-5; and two below, with 8-7-5-6 and 6-b5-3-4. There are two consonant inverted cambiatas in third species: One above the C.F., with 5-6-8-7; and one below, with 6-5-3-4.

In fifth species, cambiatas need not be quarter-note lines added to whole-note cantus firmi as in these examples, which is only a requirement of the third species, but could take many different rhythmic forms. Rhythmically, it is only essential that the dissonance that is skipped from be in a weak position, when not considering any other rules which may apply. This means further that the cambiatas need not have the same pattern of vertical intervals that the cambiatas in third species have. Example 4 shows a dissonant cambiata in fifth species.

Example 4

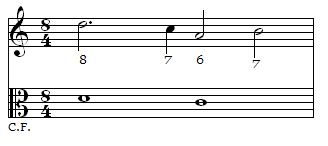

== Outside species counterpoint ==
Outside species counterpoint, what is considered a cambiata varies. What is common to all is that a note is skipped from in one direction and this is followed by motion in the opposite direction, and either the note skipped from is distinguished as a dissonance or the note skipped to is distinguished as a non-chordal tone. This means that three aspects of cambiata in species counterpoint—that the note which is skipped from must be preceded by a step, that the skip be a third, and that the note which is skipped to must be followed by a step in the opposite direction of the skip—are not necessarily all true for all patterns which are considered cambiatas. For example, a pattern in two-voice counterpoint, similar to the dissonant or dissonant inverted cambiata in species counterpoint, but which only does not follow the dissonance which is skipped to with a step in the opposite direction, but rather with a skip in the opposite direction, is still called a cambiata. This is shown in Example 5, which is from Guerrero's Ex. 16-15.

Example 6 shows a cambiata at * as a nonharmonic tone which is skipped to, rather than as a dissonance which is skipped from. It is approached by a skip in one direction and left by step in the opposite direction. The same pattern occurs at (*), and this too may be considered a cambiata, but might not if the chord is considered a major seventh rather than a triad, and so the note would not be nonharmonic.

Example 5	Example 6

== See also ==
- List of ornaments
- Echappée

== Notes ==
- Peter Schubert. Modal Counterpoint, Renaissance Style. Oxford University Press, 1999. ISBN 0-19-510912-0
