= Andolan =

Andolan may refer to:

- Andolan (music), in Hindustani music, a gentle oscillation around a note
- Andolan (1951 film), an Indian Hindi-language historical drama directed by Phani Majumdar
- Andolan (1975 film), a Hindi film of 1975 directed by Lekh Tandon
- Andolan (1995 film), an Indian Hindi-language action film directed by Aziz Sejawal
