= Slide (musical ornament) =

Musical ornament

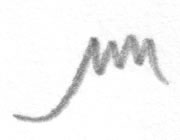
Notation

The slide (Schleifer in German, Coulé in French, Superjectio in Latin) is a musical ornament often found in baroque musical works, but used during many different periods. It instructs the performer to begin two or three scale steps below the marked note and "slide" upward—that is, move stepwise diatonically between the initial and final notes. Though less frequently found, the slide can also be performed in a descending fashion.

== History ==
In The Interpretation of Early Music, Robert Donington surveys many treatises to ascertain the history of the slide. Writing in 1654, John Playford noted that the slide can be used in ascending (he called it "elevation") or in descending (he called it "double backfall") forms. Christopher Simpson described the figure in his Division Violist: "Sometimes a note is graced by sliding to it from the third below, called an 'elevation', now something obsolete. Sometimes from the third above; which we call a double-backfall. This sliding a third, up, or down, is always done upon one string." Thomas Mace (1676) notes that the + sign above a note indicates its use.

Henry Purcell (1696), Jacques Champion de Chambonnières (1670) and Jean-Henri d'Anglebert (1689) use the French word coulé. D'Anglebert in particular shows how the slide can fill in the intervals of a major third and a perfect fourth. Jean Rousseau (1687) called the figure a plainte.

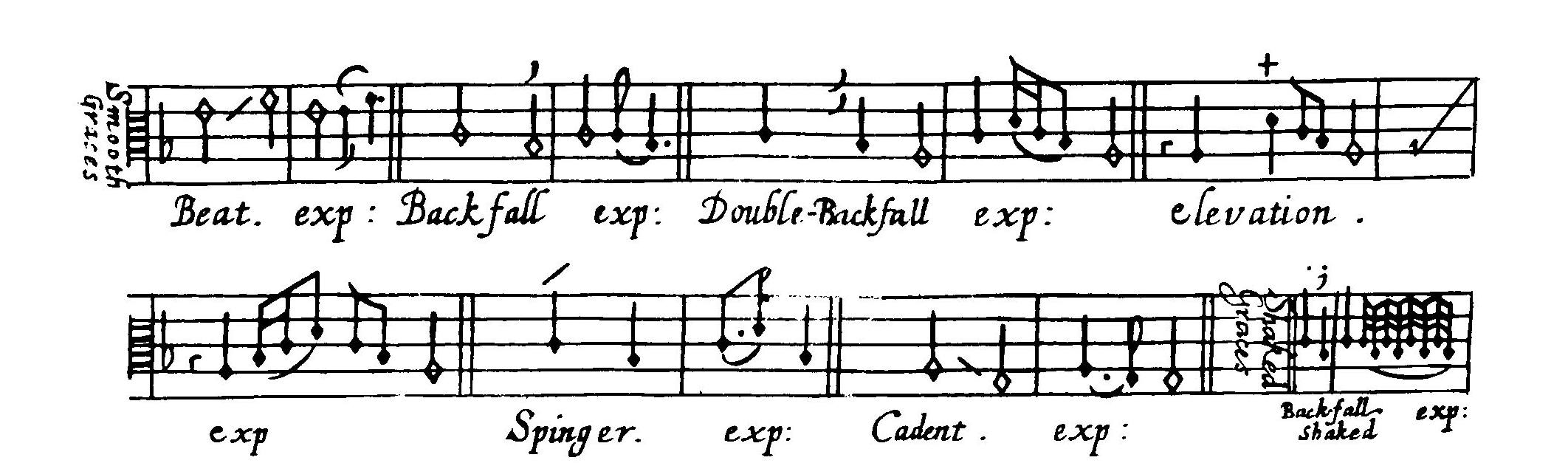
Symbols and execution of double backfall (two comma-like marks) and elevation (the + sign), from Chelys, or the Division Violist by Christopher Simpson (1665)

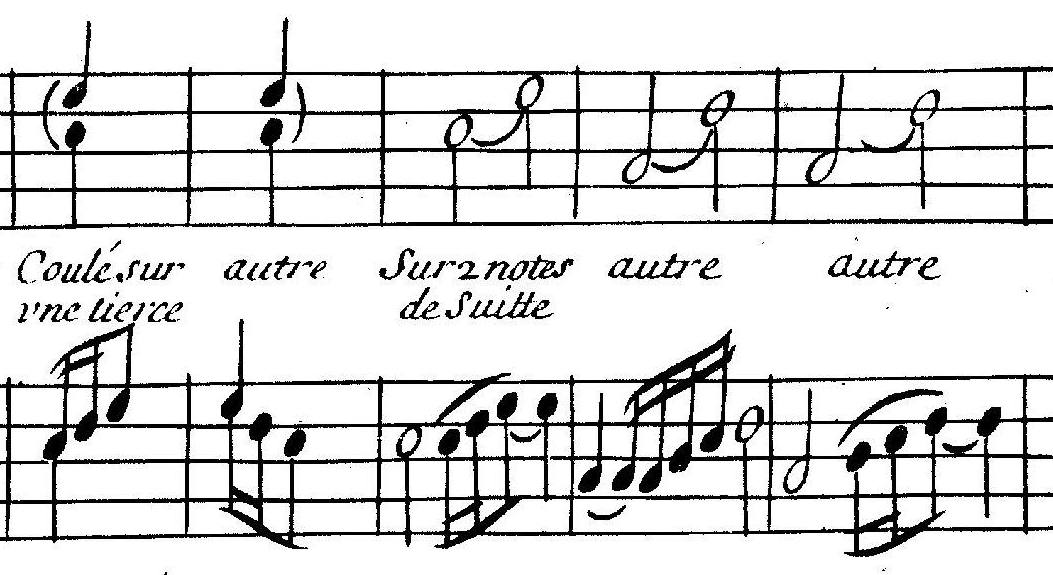
Portion of a table of embellishments and their execution showing the coulé as a slur-like marking between notes – from D'Anglebert's Pièces de Clavessin (1689)

Whereas the majority of treatises indicate the slide is to begin on the beat, Donington notes that Johann Gottfried Walther (1708) believed the slide should occur prior to the beat. Frederick Neumann (in 1973) indicates that any of the 3 notes of a 3-note slide could occur on the beat, but did not cite any sources to support this. By 1993, he stated that the slide could occur only before or on the beat (i.e. the last note of the slide on the beat, or the first note of the slide on the beat).

Carl Philipp Emanuel Bach, in his Versuch über die wahre Art das Clavier zu spielen (1753), described the slide in two ways: 1) a two-note ascending prefix to a note; and 2) a three-note prefix similar to a turn. Although he suggested a symbol for the slide (of a side-ways turn symbol), this suggestion was not generally adopted, and usually the ornament is written out. Bach felt that the use of the slide was determined by the character of the music, favoring "highly expressive movements." Regarding the three-note slide, he described it as being appropriate to works which describe "sadness in languide, adagio movements. Halting and subdued in nature, its performance should be highly expressive, and freed from slavish dependence on note values." He also noted that the ornament is more effective when some of its notes are dissonant against the bass below it.

Bach concludes his discussion of the slide by noting two important points:

1. the performer should aim for an unaffected and subdued expression, rather than trying to fill out notes;
2. the lack of multiple notes should not be seen as having more expressiveness.

Bach also suggested the slide could have a dotted rhythm, enhancing its expressiveness. As quoted by Donington, Johann Joachim Quantz (1752) indicated that undotted slides belong to the French style, whereas dotted slides are appropriate to Italian style.

Though Leopold Mozart did not use the term Schleifer in his Gründliche Violinschule (1756), his description and musical examples indicated that the slide could be used as an elaboration of and ascending or descending appoggiaturas: "It is frequently the custom to make the ascending appoggiatura from the third below, even if it should appear to flow from the neighbouring note. But in such cases one makes it mostly with two notes. ... To the passing appoggiature belong also those improvised ornamentations which I will call übersteigende and untersteigende Zwischen-Schläge [rising and falling intermediate gracenotes]. They occur between the appoggiatura and the principal note, descending quite smoothly from the appoggiatura to the principal note."

In his Clavierschule (1789, revised 1802), Johann Gottlob Türk understood two kinds of characters appropriate to slides: 1) those that are short, without dotted rhythm, and 2) those that are long and with dotted rhythm. The short slide, he said, consisted of two notes and is to be used to "increase the liveliness of a composition" and therefore needs to be played fast. It is often used when the melodic line ascends a fourth, although it also could be appended to notes moving in stepwise ascending motion. Türk indicated a preference for slides on the strong beat, citing the examples of C.P.E. Bach, but quotes Agricola (in Tosi's Anleitung zur Singkunst, p. 88) that a slide could fill out a melodic gap whose final note occurs on a weak beat.

In discussing three-note slides, Türk states that the character of the slide is wholly dependent on the mood of the music: a lively work will suggest a fast slide, and a "sorrowful" work will be the appropriate place for a slower decoration. He states that the three-note slide is used primarily on the strong beat. He explains that the dotted slide is used only in music with an "agreeable or tender character." He recommends playing the first note of the slide with emphasis and the following notes "softly and caressingly." As the first note of the slide is akin to an appoggiatura (whose length always varies according to circumstances), so too should the slide be seen whose duration is variable and dependent on context. He also warned against novice keyboard players who insert too many slides into their playing. After a discussion on the contextual mutability of slides, Türk concludes the section on slides with the wish that composers would notate slides in regular rhythms so as to remove doubt as to their correct execution.

== See also ==
- Bent note
- Glissando
- Mordent
