= Broderie =

Broderie may refer to:

- Embroidery
- Broderie (garden feature) a form of Baroque garden design
- A French term for an auxiliary note in music
