= Locks of Love =

Nonprofit charity based in United States

- Founded: May 28, 1997; 29 years ago
- Founder: Madonna W. Coffman
- Type: 501(c)(3)
- Tax ID no.: 65-0755522
- Legal status: Nonprofit organization
- Purpose: To provide custom-made hair prosthetics to disadvantaged children to age of twenty-one, who suffered hair loss as a result of various medical conditions.
- Headquarters: West Palm Beach, Florida, U.S.
- Coordinates: 26.675636°N 80.051663°W
- President: Madonna W. Coffman
- General manager: Linda Borum
- Revenue: $513,103 (2018)
- Expenses: $724,897 (2018)
- Employees: 6 (2017)
- Volunteers: 77 (2017)
- Website: locksoflove.org

Locks of Love is a 501(c)(3) nonprofit charity that provides custom-made hair prosthetics to disadvantaged children up to the age of 21 who have suffered hair loss as a result of medical conditions, such as alopecia, burn trauma, and cancer treatment. They are provided to the children free of charge, and they may receive a new one every two years until they turn 21 years old. Children and their families are never charged for the hair prosthetics they receive. Locks of Love accepts donations of human hair, and it also accepts financial donations.

== History ==
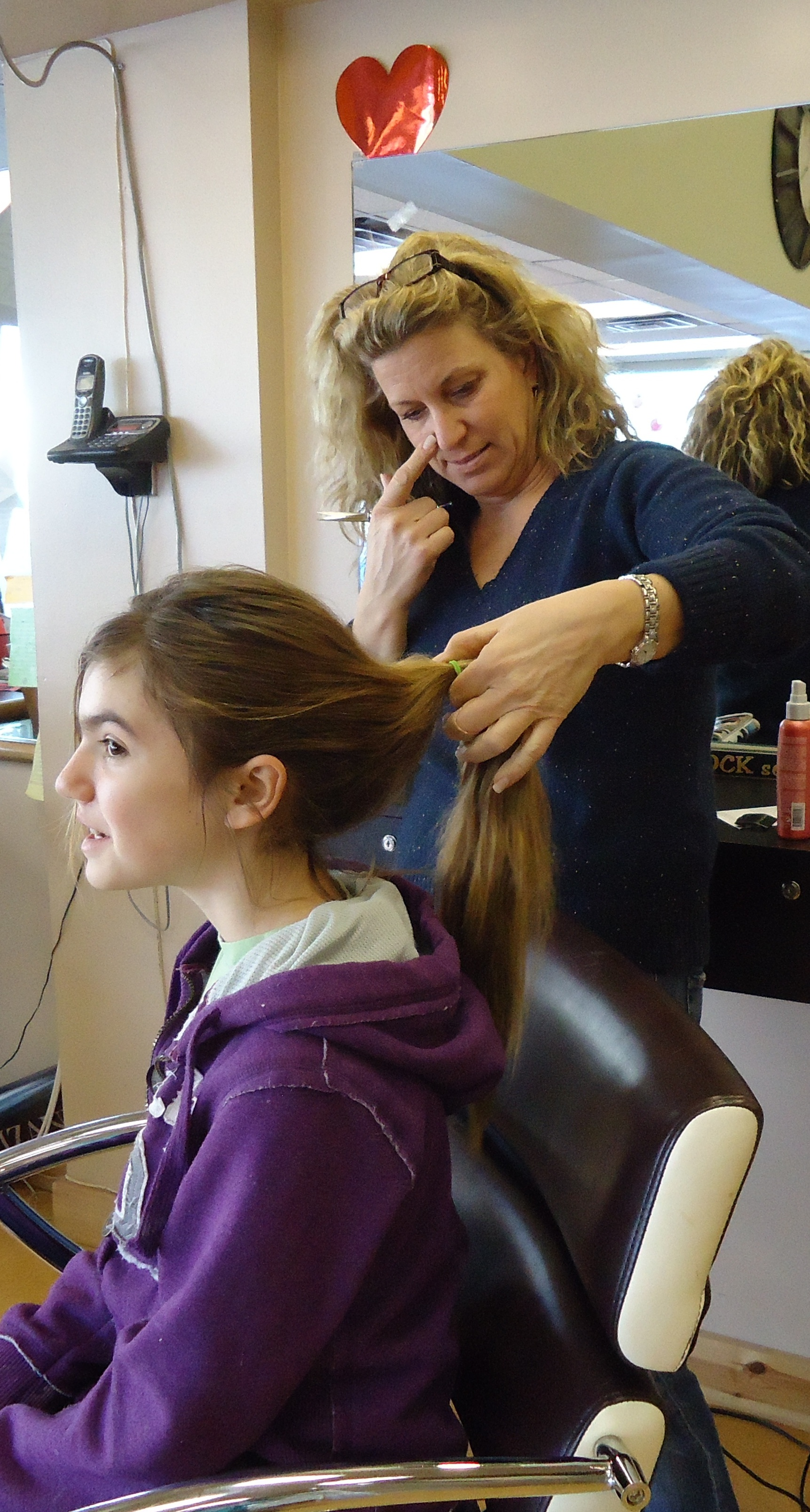
Girl donating her hair

Locks of Love was founded by Madonna W. Coffman on May 28, 1997. Coffman was a registered nurse who had suffered from alopecia in her twenties. Coffman's daughter also had alopecia and lost all her hair at the age 4. Locks of Love received a determination of its 501(c)(3) status from the Internal Revenue Service in December 1997. By September 2006, Locks of Love had provided around 2,000 wigs to recipients, completely free of charge.

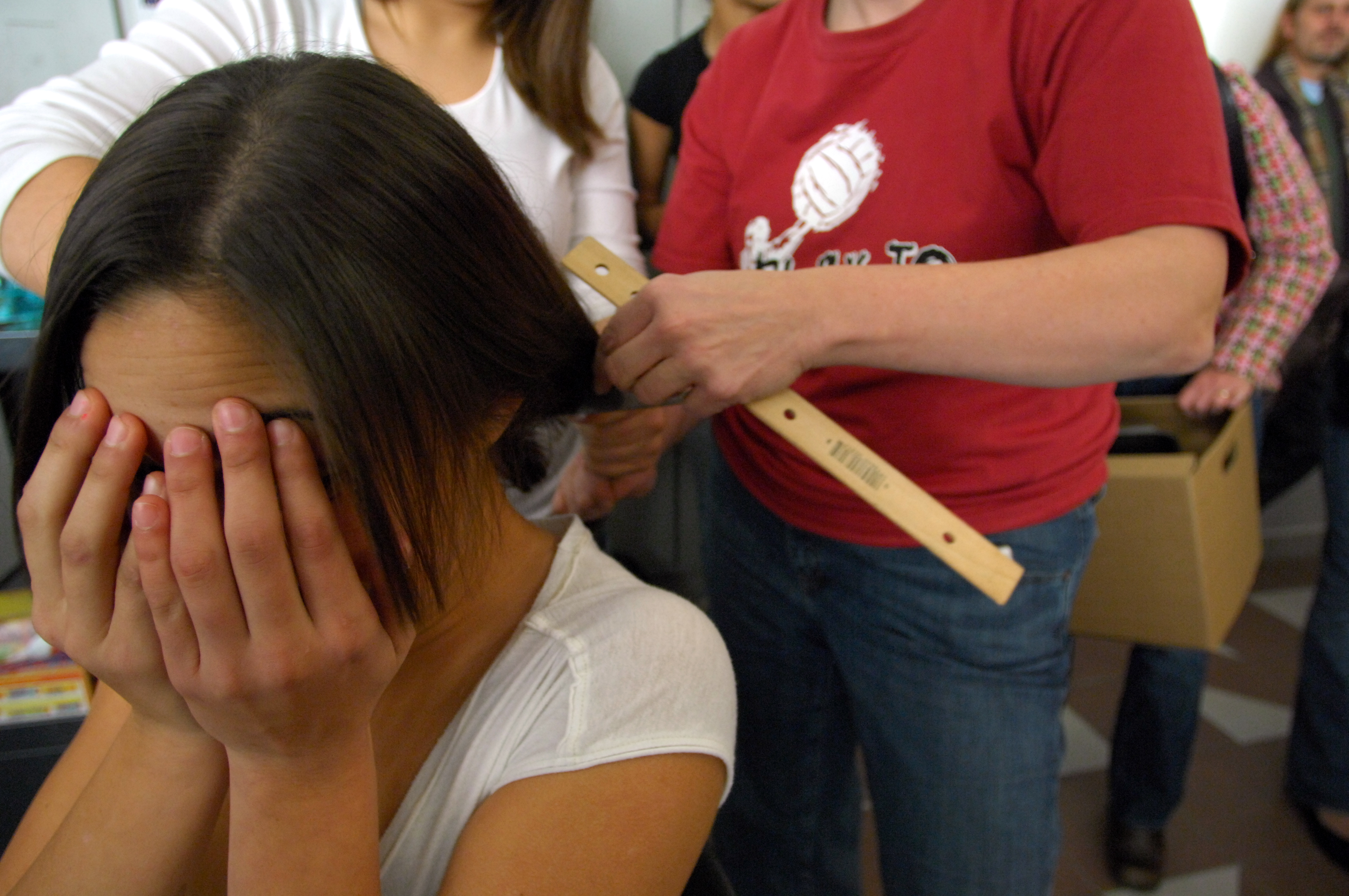
A 2007 'hair donation day' at the American Aviano Air Base in Italy

== Tax deductions ==
Financial donations to Locks of Love are tax-deductible as charitable contributions to the extent of the law. The Internal Revenue Service considers hair to be a body part, and donations of body parts are not considered tax deductible by the Internal Revenue Service. The cost of the haircut, however, may be a tax-deductible charitable contribution.

== Operations ==
The best quality hair donated to Locks of Love is sent to a wig manufacturer, Taylormade Hair Replacement in Millbrae, California. The highest quality long hair is used to make a wig for a child. To donate hair to the organization, your hair needs to be at least 10 inches long. Gray hair, overly processed hair, too-short hair, bleached hair, and hair that is otherwise not high enough quality for a child's wig is sold, and the proceeds are used to further the organization's mission, such as grants for medical research into alopecia. In 2007, Locks of Love said that about 80 percent of the hair donated to it is not suitable to be made into a child's wig.

In 2013, Forbes and The Huffington Post reported that up to US$6 million-worth of hair donations are unaccounted for by the charity each year. Snopes pointed out that the discrepancies can be attributed to the difficulty of valuing hair and that Locks of Love's tax filing shows no income that would result from black market hair sales.

During its 2018 fiscal year, Locks of Love received $513,103 of revenue, and it incurred $724,897 of expenses.

== Notable donors ==
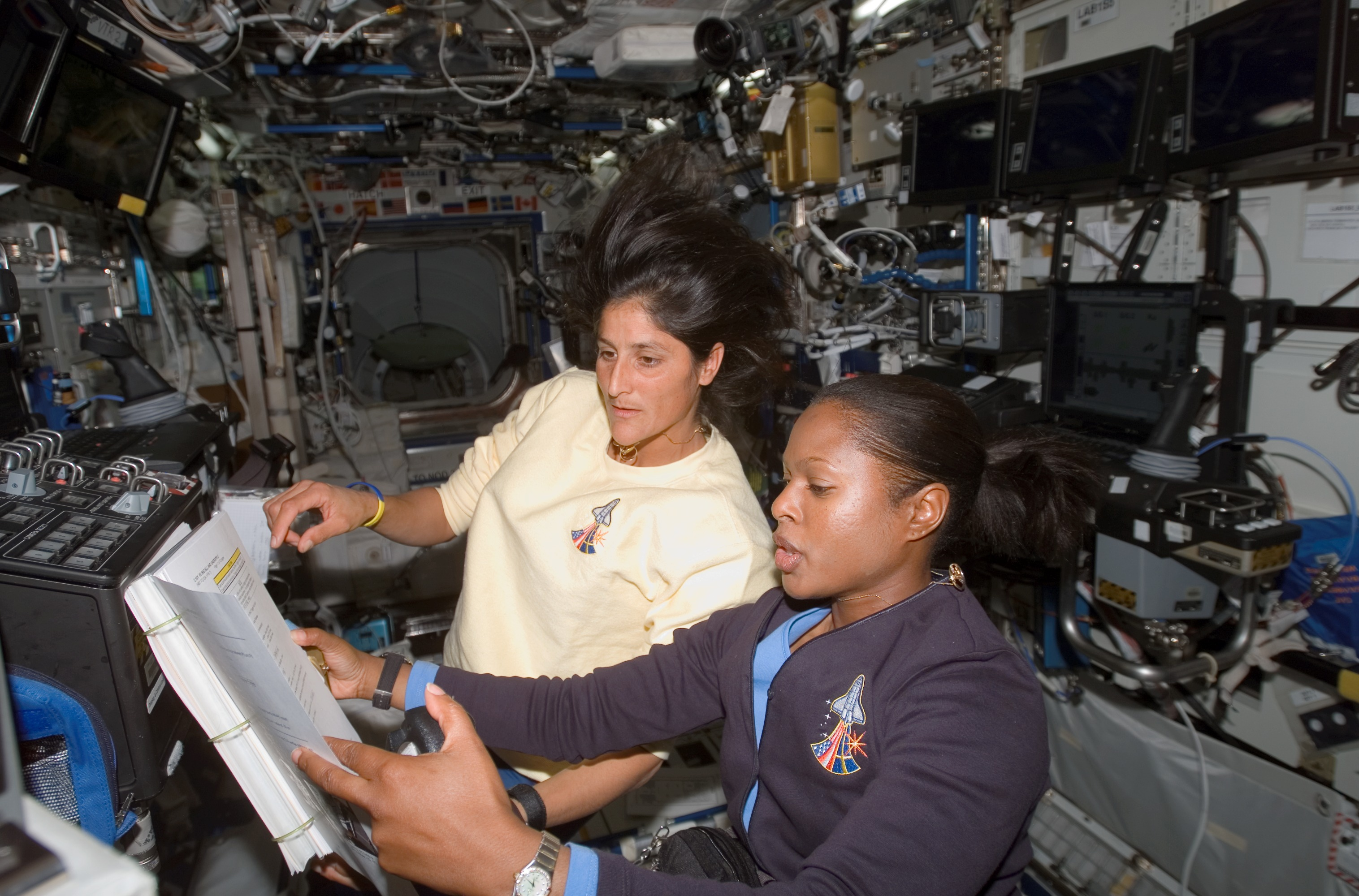
Sunita L. Williams (background) and Joan E. Higginbotham (foreground) in the International Space Station's Destiny laboratory. The hair did not clog the instrument panel, as was feared.

After launching aboard the Space Shuttle Discovery, astronaut Sunita Williams arranged to donate her ponytail to Locks of Love. Fellow astronaut Joan Higginbotham cut her hair aboard the International Space Station, and the ponytail was brought back to Earth by the STS-116 crew.

All-American football player and Chicago Bears first-round draft pick Gabe Carimi's maternal uncle suffered from leukemia as a child, underwent chemotherapy while he was in second grade, and lost his hair in the process. At nine years old, his uncle died. He was mentioned often in family discussions. Carimi thought he would do something "that wouldn't take a lot of my time but would help other people". He grew his hair for 20 months, until it was long enough to donate to Locks of Love in 2010.

Professional wrestler The Honky Tonk Man has stated that he donates his hair to Locks of Love.

National Hockey League player George Parros has grown his hair long since the start of his professional hockey career, so he can donate it to Locks of Love.

Amanda Seyfried donated her hair in 2015 to the organization.

Actor Justin Baldoni donated his hair to the organization in 2023.

== See also ==
- Zichron Menachem
