= Preparation (music) =

In tonal music, a preparation is the consonant pitch or chord which precedes a dissonant nonharmonic tone. The move from a dissonance to a consonance constitutes a resolution.

In the following example, the C major chord on the left is a preparation which precedes a nonharmonic tone that serves as an anticipation (center, marked in red) to the G major harmony on the right. This harmony resolves the preceding dissonance:
