= Zamzam (given name) =

Zamzam is a given name of East African origin.

== List of people with the given name ==
- Zam Zam Abdullahi Abdi, Somalian-Kenyan activist
- Zamzam Abdi Adan, Somali politician
- Zamzam Dahir Mohamud, Somali politician
- Zamzam Ibrahim, British-Somali student politician
- Zamzam Mohamed, Kenyan politician
- Zamzam Mohamed Farah (born 1991), Somali female athlete

== See also ==
- Zamzam (disambiguation)
- Zamzama
