= Cruciform =

Christian physical phenomena resembling a cross shape

Cruciform describes objects resembling a common cross or Christian cross. These include architectural shapes, biology, art, and design.

== Cruciform architectural plan ==
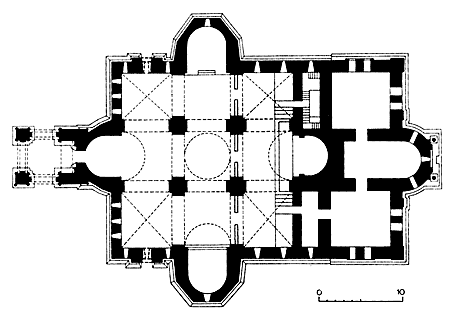
Etchmiadzin cathedral

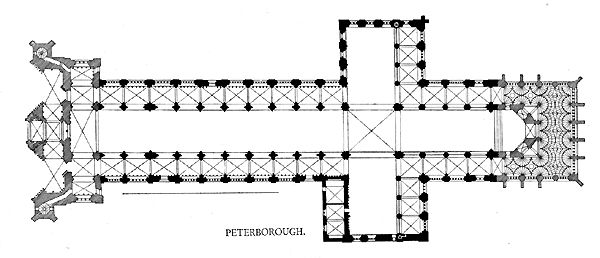
Peterborough Cathedral

Christian churches are commonly described as having a cruciform architecture. In Early Christian, Byzantine and other Eastern Orthodox forms of church architecture this is likely to mean a tetraconch plan, a Greek cross, with arms of equal length or, later, a cross-in-square plan.

In the Western churches, a cruciform architecture usually, though not exclusively, means a church built with the layout developed in Gothic architecture. This layout comprises:

- An east end, containing an altar and often with an elaborate, decorated window, through which light will shine in the early part of the day.
- A west end, which sometimes contains a baptismal font, being a large decorated bowl, in which water can be firstly, blessed (dedicated to the use and purposes of God) and then used for baptism.
- North and south transepts, being "arms" of the cross and often containing rooms for gathering, small side chapels, or in many cases other necessities such as an organ and toilets.
- The crossing, which in later designs often was under a tower or dome.

In churches that are not oriented with the altar at the geographical east end, it is usual to refer to the altar end as "liturgical east" and so forth.

Methodist tabernacles also have a cruciform shape.

== Cruciform DNA ==
Holliday Junction

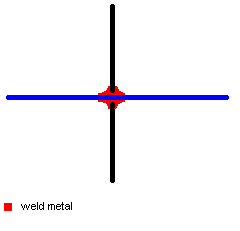
Cruciform joint

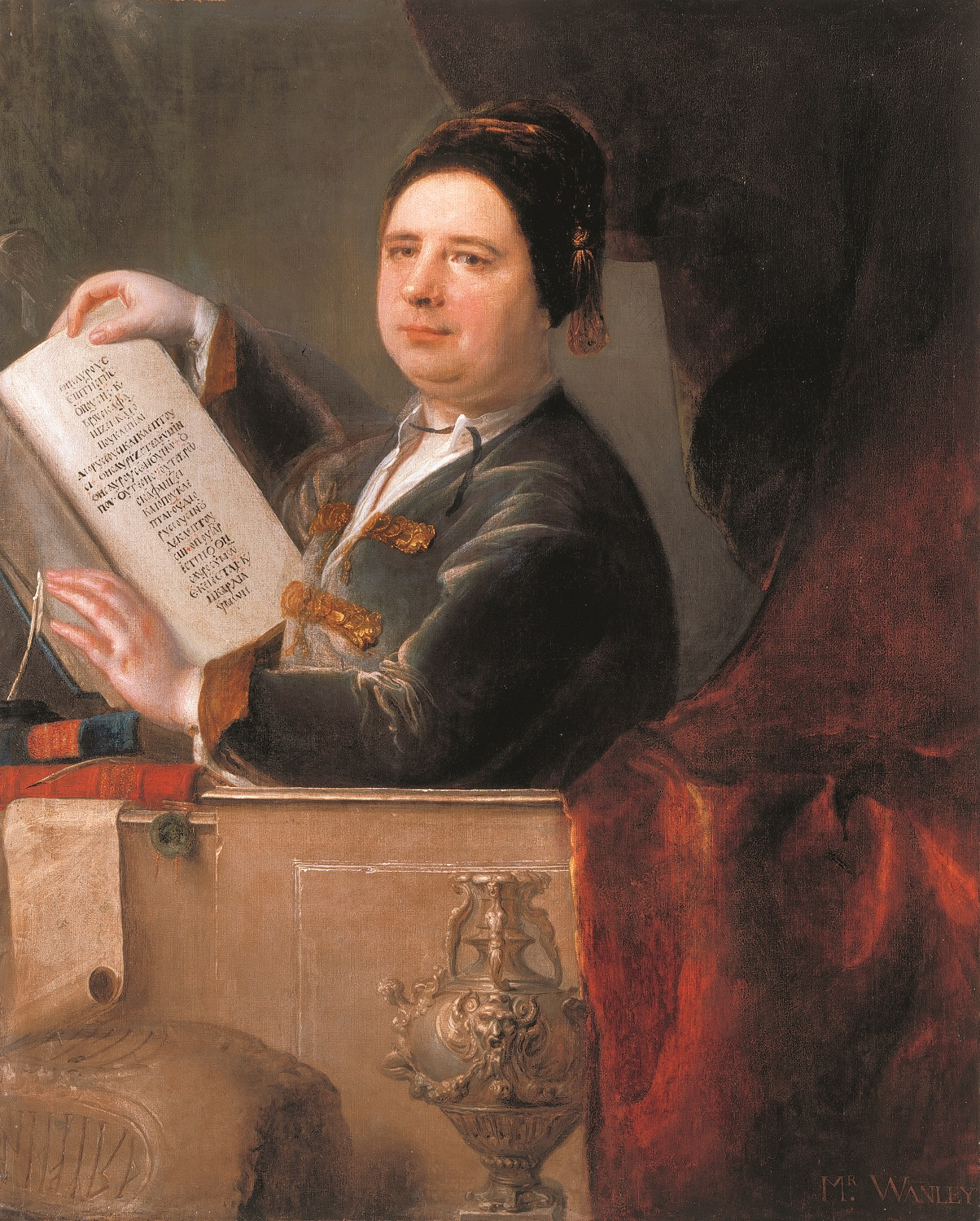
Librarian Humfrey Wanley holding a facsimile copy of a cruciform Greek manuscript (Lectionary 150)

DNA can undergo transitions to form a cruciform shape, including a structure called a Holliday junction. This structure is important for the critical biological processes of DNA recombination and repair mutations that occur in the cell.

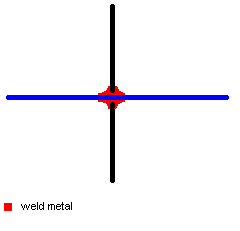
Cruciform joint

== Cruciform joint ==
A cruciform joint is a specific joint in which four spaces are created by the welding of three plates of metal at right angles.

== Cruciform manuscript ==
A cruciform manuscript was a form of Anglo-Saxon / Insular manuscript written with the words in a block shaped like a cross.

== Cruciform melody ==
In music, a melody of four pitches where a straight line drawn between the outer pair bisects a straight line drawn between the inner pair, thus forming a cross. In its simplest form, the cruciform melody is a changing tone, where the melody ascends or descends by step, skips below or above the first pitch, then returns to the first pitch by step. Often representative of the Christian cross, such melodies are cruciform in their retrogrades or inversions. Johann Sebastian Bach, whose last name may be represented in tones through a musical cryptogram known as the BACH motif that is a cruciform melody, employed the device extensively. The subject of the fugue in c-sharp minor from The Well-Tempered Clavier Book I is cruciform. See also: Cross motif.

== Cruciform tail ==
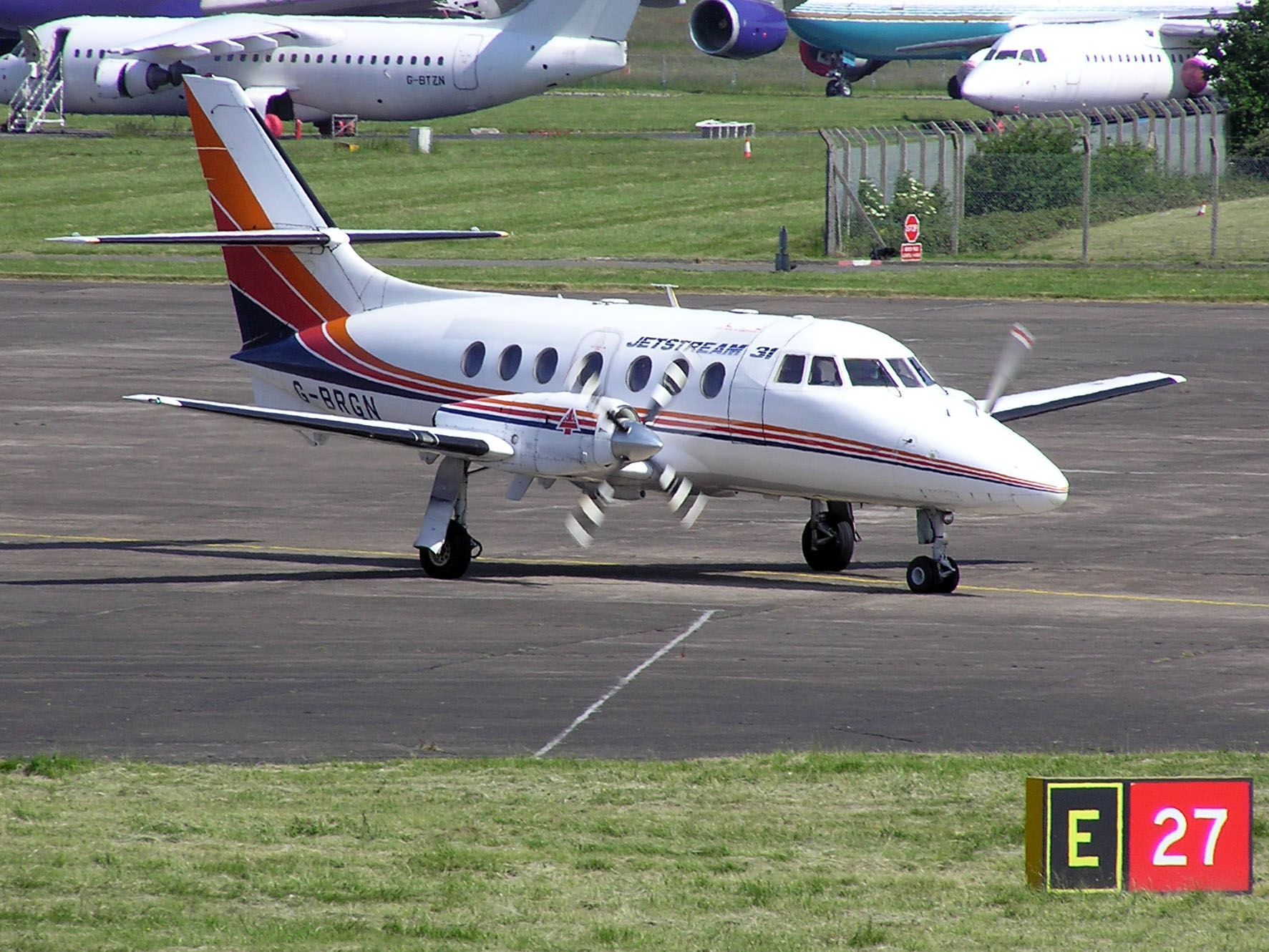
Jetstream 31 with cruciform tail

Some airplanes use a cruciform tail design, wherein the horizontal stabilizer is positioned midway up the vertical stabilizer, forming a cruciform shape when viewed from the front or rear. Some examples are the F-9 Cougar, the F-10 Skyknight and the Sud Aviation Caravelle.

The cruciform tail gives the benefit of clearing the aerodynamics of the tail away from the wake of the engine, while not requiring the same amount of strengthening of the vertical tail section in comparison with a T-tail design.

== Cruciform sword ==
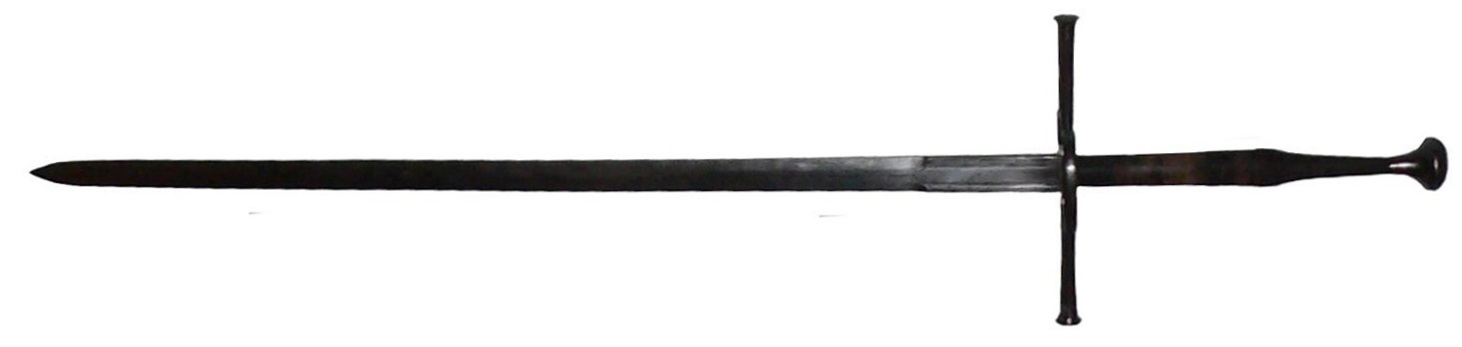
Swiss longsword, 15th or 16th century

The plain sword used by knights, distinctive due to the flat bar used as a guard. The overall shape of the sword when held point down is that of a cross.

It was very popular due to the protection it offered to the hand and certain attacks that rely on the cross to trap the blade of the enemy. See Sword.

== Cruciform product design ==
In addition to common cross-shaped products, such as key chains and magnets, certain designers have gone so far as to create cruciform devices and accessories. For example, the mass-produced cruciform MP3 player "Saint B", or the "iBelieve", an accessory that converts the original iPod Shuffle into a cross shape designed by Scott Wilson in 2005. The cruciform MP3 players often come preloaded with audio files of the New Testament, but are mainly purchased for users to proudly display their faith.

== See also ==
- Crucifix
