= Gamaka (music) =

Ornamentation in Indian classical music

Gamaka (Hindi: गमक / Urdu: گمک) (also spelled gamakam) refer to ornamentation that is used in the performance of North and South Indian classical music. Gamaka can be understood as embellishment done on a note or between two notes. Present-day Carnatic music uses at least fifteen different kinds of ornamentation. Gamaka is any graceful turn, curve or cornering touch given to a single note or a group of notes, which adds emphasis to each raga's individuality. Gamaka can be understood as any movement done on a note or in between two notes. The unique character of each raga is given by its gamakas, making their role essential rather than decorative in Indian music. Nearly all Indian musical treatises have a section dedicated to describing, listing and characterising gamakas.

The term gamaka itself means "ornamented note" in Sanskrit. Gamakas involve the variation of pitch of a note, using oscillations or glides between notes. Each raga has specific rules on the types of gamakas that might be applied to specific notes, and the types that may not.

Various commentators on Indian music have mentioned different numbers of gamakas. For example, Sarangadeva describes fifteen gamakas, Narada in Sangeeta Makaranda describes nineteen gamakas, and Haripala in Sangeet Sudhakar describes seven gamakas.

== Types of gamakas in Indian music ==
1. Tiripa
2. Sphurita
3. Kampita
4. Leena
5. Andolita
6. Vali
7. Tribhinna
8. Kurula
9. Aahata
10. Ulhasita
11. Humphita
12. Mudrita
13. Namita
14. Plavita
15. Mishrita

=== Carnatic music gamakas ===
Carnatic music has several ornamentation classes, which can be divided into major groups as shown in the table below. These and many more gamakas are mentioned in various treatises and compositions, including Arohana (ascending patterns), Avarohana (descending patterns), ahata & pratyahata.

Carnatic ragas can be divided into several categories based on their tolerance and dependence on gamakas. For instance, ragas like Nayaki, Sahana, Devagandhari, Yadukulakambhojhi, etc., can never exist without key gamakas like kampita. Ragas like Keeravani and Shanmukhapriya can sound acceptable with full or partial oscillations. Ragas like Hindola and Revati can be rendered with minimal oscillations.

Carnatic Ornamentation Category	Western music Equivalent	Subtypes
Kampita	Deflections/oscillations	Kampita – Probably the defining gamaka in Carnatic, kampita is the oscillation of notes. Most of these oscillations are unique to Carnatic and distinctive from other shakes seen in world music. Kampita can be of various types based on speed, amplitude and/or number of repeats the note is oscillated, based on musical context within a raga. For instance, the Ma in Shankarabharana/Begada can be oscillated in various ways based on the type of phrase rendered and its preceding/succeeding notes or phrase. Nokku – stress from above on successive (non-repeated) tones, Odukkal – stress from below on successive (non-repeated) tones, Orikai – momentary flick, at the end of the main tone, to a higher tone
Janta	Fingered/vocalised Stresses	Sphurita – A note repeated twice with upward force from the note immediately below on the 2nd time (SS-RR-GG-MM etc), Ahata - 2 note phrases in ascending order where the first note is given an upward force from the note immediately below (SR-RG-GM-MP-PD, etc) Pratyahata – 2 note phrases in descending order, where the first note is given an upward force from the note immediately below (SN-ND-DP-PM-MG etc) Khandippu – sharp dynamic accent, Tripuchcha - A note repeated 3 times with upward force from the note immediately below on 2nd & 3rd times (SSS-RRR-GGG-MMM etc)
Andola	Swings	Movements of various notes in a swinging fashion (SRSG,G - SRSM,M - SRSP,P) etc
Daalu/Daatu	Skips	Daalu - Jumping to various notes from the same note - SG - SM - SP - SD or GD - GN - GS etc. Daatu - Skipping notes from any note - RM, DS, PR, NPRM, SGPS etc
Jaaru/Ullasita	Glides/glissandos	Irakka-jaru – descending slide, Etra-jaru – ascending slide
Tribhinna	Polyphony	Striking 3 notes at the same time (usually on instruments)

=== Hindustani music gamakas ===
Hindustani music has five gamakas. The gamaka is similar to meend and andolan.

== Gamakas in musical notation ==
Notation for gamakas is generally not found in the Indian music system. There can be considerable difficulty in conveying the complex and fluid melodic movement of gamakas in a notation system that uses fixed pitch signs. In Carnatic music in particular, the notation of gamakas is often unnecessary, as performers use notation as a memory aid for compositions they already learned by hearing and imitating.

However, there are some old scripts and books like the Sangeetha Sampradaya Pradarshini, which have specific signs to indicate the gamakas that have to be used for each note. Usage of such symbols makes it easier to understand the notation and to sing the composition.

Musician Ramesh Vinayakam has invented a system named "Gamaka box" notation to notate the Gamakas so that any one can sing them by seeing the notation. He has received a patent for the Gamaka box notation.

== See also ==
- alankara/palta, pattern of musical decoration in Indian classical music
- List of ornaments
