= Division viol =

English stringed instrument

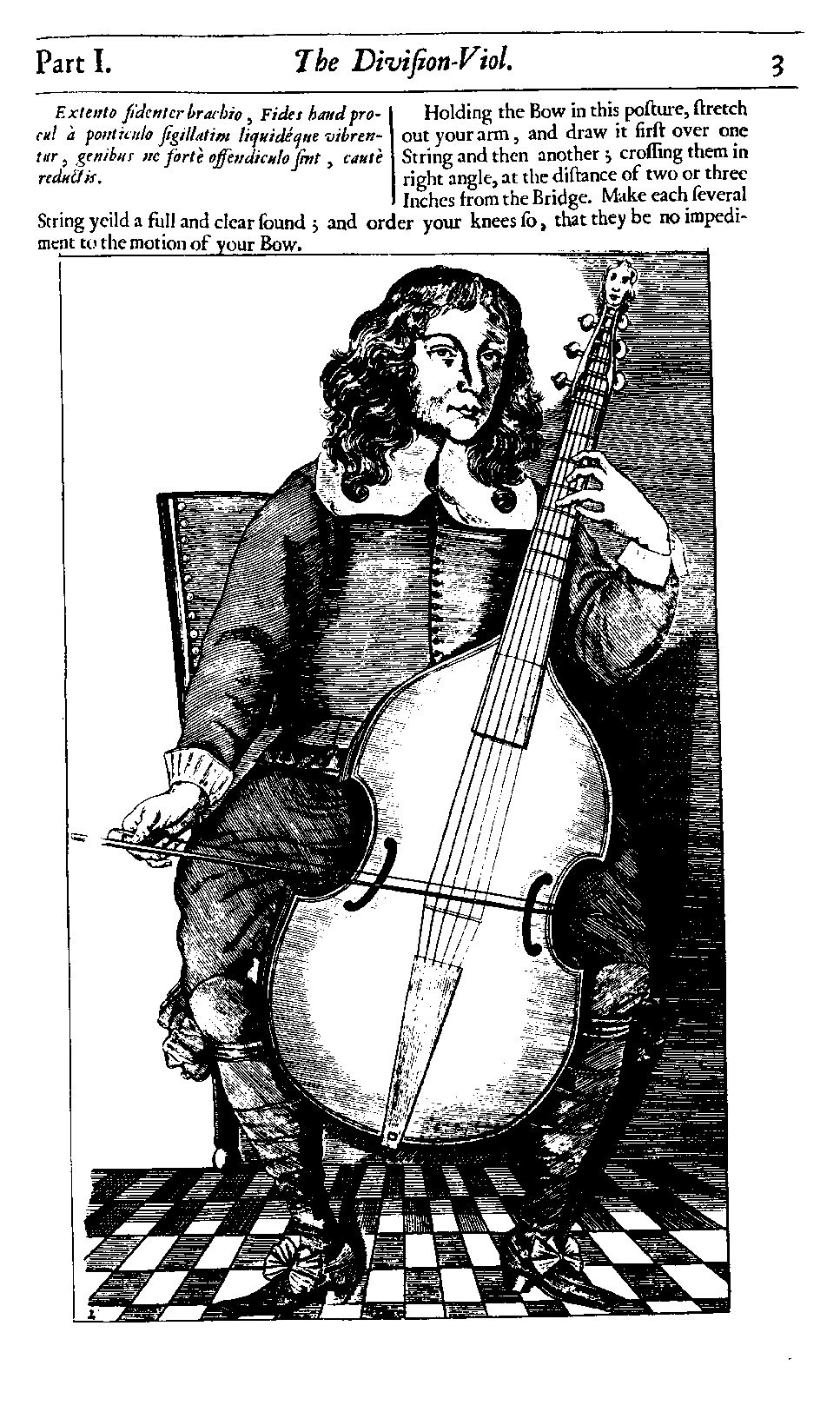
- Classification: Bowed string instrument

Related instruments
- Viol

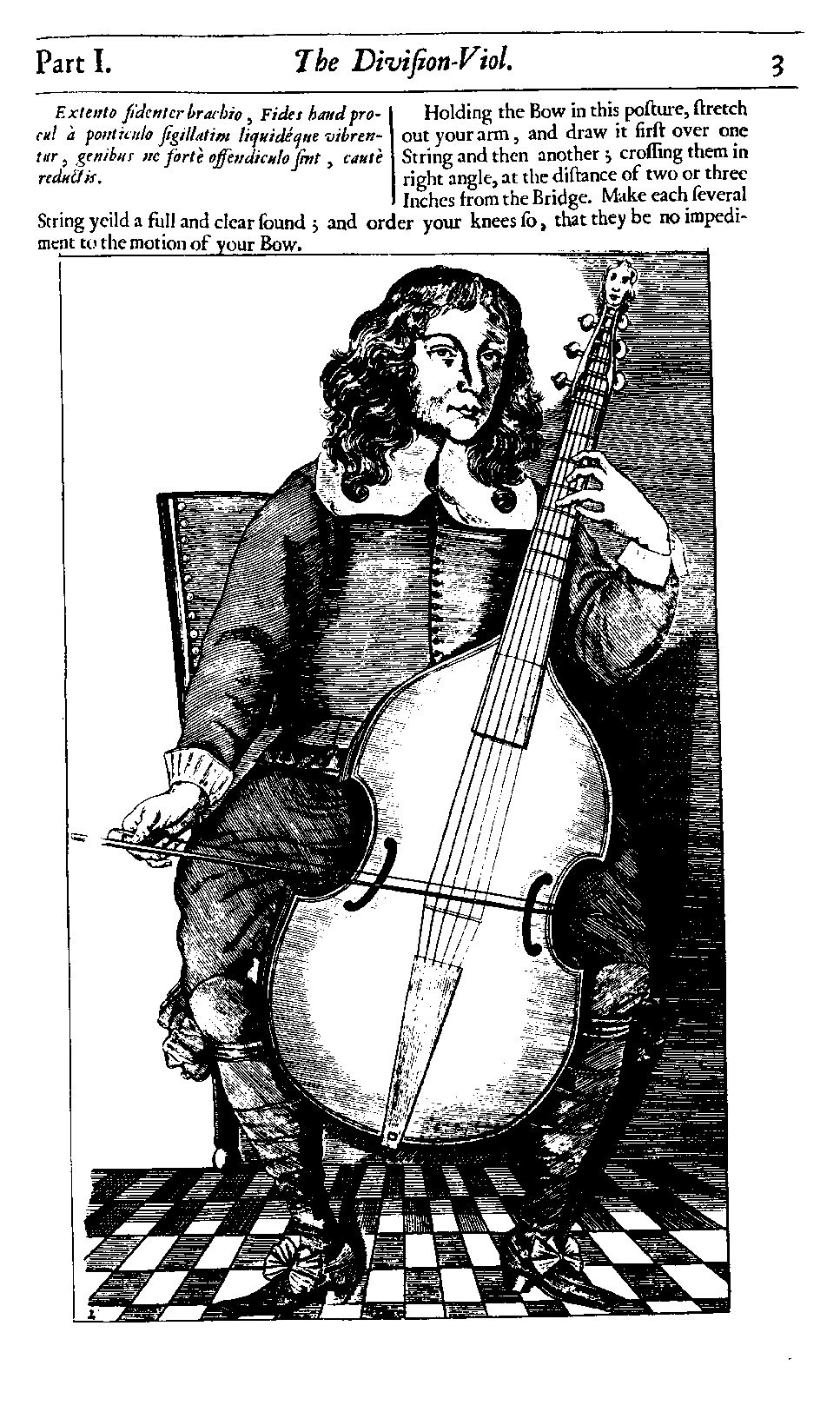
From The Division-viol, an explanation and illustration of proper posture while playing the viol. It reads "Holding the bow in this posture, stretch out your arm, and draw it first over one string and then another; crossing them in right angle, at the distance of two or three inches from the bridge. Make each several string yield a full and clear sound; and order your knees so, that they be no impediment to the motion of your bow."

The division viol is an English type of bass viol, which was originally popular in the mid-17th century, but is currently experiencing a renaissance of its own due to the movement for historically informed performance. John Playford mentions the division viol in his A Brief Introduction of 1667, describing it as smaller than a consort bass viol, but larger than a lyra viol.

As suggested by its name, (divisions were a type of variations), the division viol is intended for highly ornamented music, and for improvisations. The division viol also had a very large range with the tuning D–G–c–e–a–d', resulting in the ability of skilled players to play divisions on any part in a polyphonic vocal piece.

The division viol may be historically connected with the viola bastarda, and came into being in the mid-17th century in England. Music for the division viol was mainly linear, although there were occasionally lyra-like passages, and music for it was written on a staff, rather than in tablature like the lyra viol's music.

Christopher Simpson, a prominent viol player, wrote a treatise on how to play the division viol, aptly titled The Division-viol, or The Art of Playing ex tempore to a Ground (1665), and also The Division-Violist (1659). Both of these are frequently used as references by those interested in historically informed performance on the viol.

Although the division viol is a specialized instrument for playing divisions, divisions of the same period that this instrument flourished were almost as likely to be played on a consort bass or a lyra viol, and instruments constructed as division viols were certainly used in consorts when called upon.
