= Viola bastarda =

Viol performance style

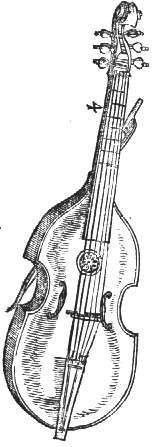
- Classification: Bowed string instrument style or technique

Related instruments
- Viol

Lyra bastarda is a common misnomer for the baryton.

Viola bastarda refers to a highly virtuosic style of composition or extemporaneous performance, as well as to the altered viols created to maximize players' ability to play in this style. In the viola bastarda style, a polyphonic composition is reduced to a single line, while maintaining the same range as the original, and adding divisions, improvisations, and new counterpoint. The style flourished in Italy in the late 16th and early 17th centuries. Francesco Rognoni, a prominent composer of divisions, stated that although works using the bastarda techniques could be played by a number of instruments, including organ, lute, and harp, the "queen" of bastarda technique was the viol because of its agility and large range.

The first use of the term was by Girolamo Dalla Casa in a 1584 treatise. Rognoni's Selva de varii passaggi (Milan 1620) was the definitive treatise on viola bastarda technique. Earlier bastarda compositions were accompanied by viol consort or plucked instrument such as the lute or harpsichord, with another instrument on the bass line. Later compositions were accompanied by continuo bass. The last composer to write for the bastarda was Vincenzo Bonizzi, in Alcune opere di diverse auttori a diverse voci, passaggiate principalmente per la viola bastarda (1626).

Viola bastarda music is written for standard viol tuning, in fourths with a third in the middle. Early sources speak of the viola bastarda as a style of playing, and the ranges of pieces written during this time indicate that bastarda pieces were played on whichever size viol was at hand; however, Rognoni describes the standard size of a viola bastarda as between that of a tenor and bass viol, indicating a change in understanding of the term. It may be related to the English division viol.
