= Zamzama (music) =

Zamzama is a Persian word meaning "Thunder," or "Roar", but it can also mean "murmur" or "whisper to oneself". As with many Arabic and Persian words, it has been taken into Urdu and is now considered indigenous to that language. The meaning is: addition of notes. Zamzama is a type of Alankar) and part of the note ornamentation in Indian classical music.

Like a khatka, another type of Alankara, zamzama is a cluster of notes, which is used by the musician to embellish the landing note. The difference to a khatka is that the notes in a zamzama are rendered in progressive combinations and permutations. For the listener it sounds like a complex taan pattern with sharp gamaks.

Zamzamas are an integral part of tappa singing. In Khayal renditions it needs to be used with great caution by the vocalist, depending on the raga.

== Source/Reference ==
- Types of Alankaras in Indian Classical Music - Alankars: A Background (ITC SRA)
- Alankars - Zamzama (ITC SRA)
