= Christopher Simpson (musician) =

English musician and composer

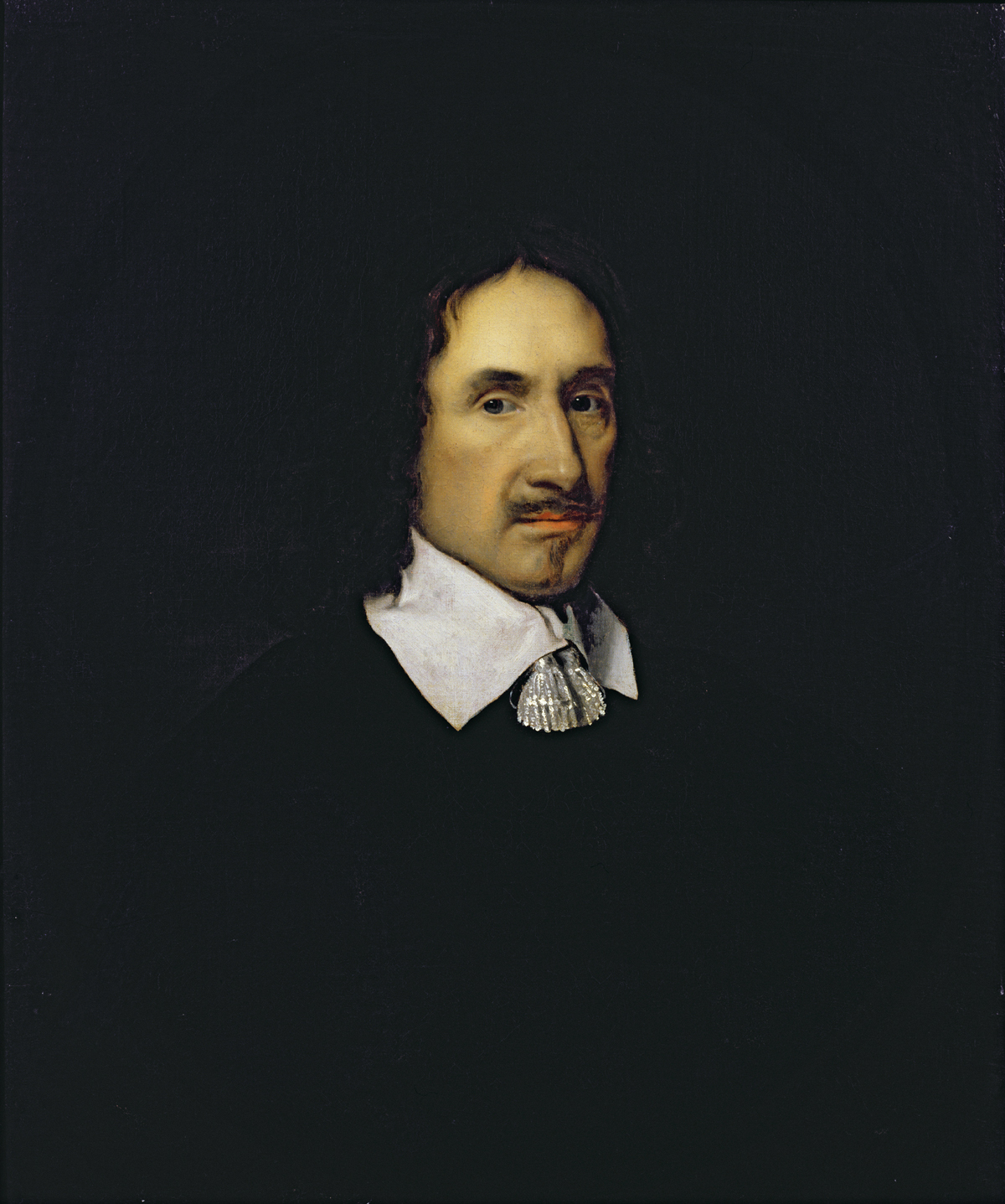
Portrait of Christopher Simpson

Christopher Simpson (1602/1606–1669) was an English musician and composer, particularly associated with music for the viola da gamba.

== Life ==
Simpson was born between 1602 and 1606, probably at Egton, North Yorkshire. He was the eldest son of Christopher Sympson, a Yorkshireman, who is usually described as a cordwainer but who was also the manager of a theatre company patronised by wealthy Yorkshire Catholics. It is thought that Sympson senior may have preferred to portray himself at times as a simple craftsman, rather than a high-profile Catholic sympathiser, at a time when Catholics were harshly persecuted in England. There is a theory (put forward by Urquhart) that Christopher Simpson (junior), the musician, could have been the same Simpson (or Sampson) who was educated as a Jesuit in continental Europe and was ordained as a Catholic priest in 1629. However, Simpson's death in 1669 is at odds with the evidence that the Jesuit Simpson lived until 1674.

Simpson fought in the English Civil War, on the Royalist side and, in 1642, was a quarter-master in the army of the Earl (later Duke) of Newcastle. Following the siege of York, Simpson took refuge at the manor of Sir Robert Bolles (1619–1663), at Scampton, Lincolnshire, where Bolles employed him as a resident musician and tutor to his son John.

Simpson remained in the Bolles' household (either in Lincolnshire, or their house in London) for the remainder of his life. His will was made on 5 May 1669 and was proved in London on 29 July 1669. It seems likely that he died at Sir John Bolles' house in Holborn, London, or possibly at Scampton Hall.

== Works ==
Simpson made a small contribution to John Playford's work A Brief Introduction to the Skill of Musick but is best known for his book, The Division Viol, or the Art of Playing upon a Ground (published 1659) which is a set of practical instructions, organised into three sections: Of the Viol itself, with Instructions how to Play upon it; Use of the Concords, or a Compendium of Descant; and The Method of ordering Division to a Ground. The second edition (published in 1665) is a parallel text in English and Latin, thus addressing both the British and continental European markets. It was a highly successful publication and continued to appear in new editions for sixty years after the death of its author. With the revival of early music during the 20th century and renewed interest in the viol, Simpson's book was read with renewed interest by those who sought to rediscover the "authentic" technique for playing the instrument.

The accompanying portrait of Simpson appears in The Division Viol. In the first edition, he is depicted wearing a hat but, in later editions, the picture has been modified to show him bare-headed, as here. The picture also illustrates some of the characteristic techniques of viol-playing. For instance, it is clear that the bow is held underhand (with the palm upwards), unlike the technique used for the modern cello or violin. It can also be seen that the second and third finger of the right hand rest on the bow-hair, allowing them to be used to vary the tension of the bow during playing.

Simpson wrote a short guide to musical composition in 1665: The Principles of Practical Musick (dedicated to Sir John St. Barbe, another of his pupils) and expanded this into his 1667 publication A Compendium of Practical Musick.

Very few of Simpson's musical compositions appeared in print during his lifetime, except those included as examples in his books. Some of his compositions survive in manuscript form. For example, he composed two sets of fantasias entitled The Monthes and The Seasons, which both consist of one treble and two bass viol parts, with continuo. The Seasons was recorded by Hille Perl (as one of the Sirius Viols) in 2016, with extensive liner notes about the piece.

All his surviving instrumental works are for viol ensembles or the solo viol, an instrument about which he wrote that "a viol in the hands of an excellent violist may (no doubt) be reckoned amongst the best of musical instruments. To play extempore to the ground is the highest perfection of it".
