= Robert Donington =

English musicologist (1907–1990)

Robert Donington OBE (4 May 1907 – 20 January 1990) was an English musicologist and instrumentalist. He was influential in the early music movement and in Wagner studies.

== Life and career ==
Robert Donington was born on 4 May 1907 in Leeds, Englands, UK. was educated at St Paul's School, London, and studied at the University of Oxford. His expert knowledge of early instruments and the interpretation of pre-classical music owed much to a period of study with Arnold Dolmetsch at Haslemere, Surrey. He was appointed OBE in the 1979 Birthday Honours.

He died in Firle, Sussex on 20 January 1990 at the age of 82.

== Selected publications ==
=== Books ===
- The Instruments of Music (1949).
- Tempo and Rhythm in Bach's Organ Music (1960).
- The Interpretation of Early Music (1963).
- Wagner's Ring and its Symbols (1963).
- String playing in baroque music, with recorded illustrations by Yehudi Menuhin, George Malcolm, (1977).
- A performer's guide to baroque music (1973).
- The Rise of Opera (1981).
- Baroque Music: Style and Performance, a Handbook (1982).
- Opera and its symbols : the unity of words, music, and staging (1990).

=== Articles ===
- The Psychology of Tristan, Times Literary Supplement, 18 June 1971, pp 699–700
