= Zichron Menachem =

- זכרון מנחם
- Founded: 1990; 36 years ago
- Founders: Chaim and Miri Ehrental
- Legal status: Nonprofit organization
- Purpose: To support children with cancer and their families, and to children who have a parent with cancer.
- Headquarters: Jerusalem
- Chairman: Chaim Ehrenthal
- Website: www.zichron.org

Zichron Menachem ("Memorial for Menachem") is the Israeli nonprofit organization for the support of children with cancer and their families. It offers immediate, practical and long-term solutions to the wide range of problems that must be overcome from the moment that a child has been diagnosed with cancer. It also provides support to children who have a parent living with cancer. The organization is headquartered in Jerusalem and operates in all major Israeli hospitals with pediatric oncology/hematology wards.

== History ==
Menachem Ehrental was an Israeli boy who battled cancer from the age of 2 until his death at age 15. Menachem's parents, Chaim and Miri Ehrental founded Zichron Menachem as a nonprofit organization with the mission of easing the suffering of young cancer patients and their families.

By 2006, Zichron Menachem had provided support to thousands of children and families. It operates a nationwide network of professionally trained volunteers across Israel.

Many people are grateful for the support provided the association.

== Programs ==
All Zichron Menachem programs, activities and facilities are offered free-of-charge to children stricken with cancer, and their families, regardless of their religion, ethnic origin or socio-economic status.

Its programs include:

- Support groups for parents, bereaved parents and children
- Big brothers and big sisters
- Permanent hospital staffing
- Three annual adventure camps
- Weekly parties
- Fun days
- Reservoir of blood products
- Guesthouse
- Hair wigs for cancer patients, made from hair donated by volunteers
- Lending library
- Psycho-social and professional support
- Advocacy

== Day center ==
The Zichron Menachem Day Center in Jerusalem is an educational, recreational, and rehabilitation facility for children with cancer and their families. Some children undergoing treatment may be unable to attend regular school or social activities. The center provides space for education, therapies, and organized activities, including music, computing, art, sports, photography, and journalism. Activities are also available to siblings during the afternoon and early evening.

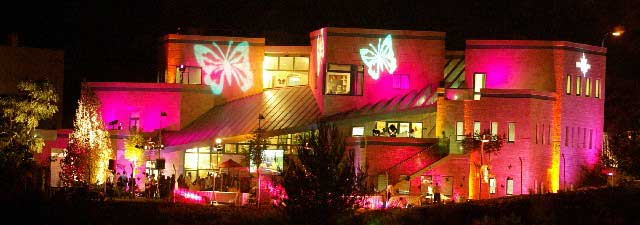
The Zichron Menachem Day Center in Jerusalem

== Awards ==
In recognition of its humanitarian activities, Zichron Menachem has been awarded with awards, including:

- Israel President's Prize for Volunteers
- Israel Prime Minister's Child Protector Award
- Israel Health Minister's Prize for Volunteers (2000, Chaim and Miri Ehrental, 2006, Zohar Hala)
- The Mayor of Jerusalem’s Citation for Volunteers
- Order of Orange-Nassau Knight's Medal from Queen Beatrix (I) of the Netherlands (Mrs. Borie Maarsen)

== Organization ==
Zichron Menachem is a registered nonprofit, charitable organization in Israel, the US, and the United Kingdom. Friends of Zichron Menachem organizations and committees in the USA ('The Children's Bridge of Zichron Menachem'), UK, and Europe help support Zichron Menachem's programs, activities and facilities.
