= Andolan (music) =

In Hindustani music andholan (Hindi: अंदोलन) as a specific form of ornament (alankar) is a gentle oscillation around a note, touching the periphery of an adjacent note as well as shrutis in between. The notes (andolit swars) used for andolan depend on the raga.
