= Alankāra =

Term in Indian classical music

Alankara (Sanskrit: अलंकार, romanized: Alaṃkāra), also referred to as palta or alankaram, is a concept in Indian classical music and literally means "ornament, decoration". An alankara is any pattern of musical decoration a musician or vocalist creates within or across tones, based on ancient musical theories or driven by personal creative choices, in a progression of svaras. The term alankara is standard in Carnatic music, while the same concept is referred to as palta or alankara in Hindustani music.

The ancient and medieval music scholars of India state that there are unlimited creative possibilities available to a musician, but each scholar illustrated the concept with a set of alankara. Datilla discussed 13 alankaras, Bharata Muni presented 33, Sarngadeva described 63 alankaras, while mid medieval scholars presented numerous more. The Indian music tradition classifies alankara as rational or irrational, wherein irrational alankara being those that cannot be reduced to a fixed scale degree pattern. The Indian theory of gamaka covers the group of irrational alankara. The concept of alankara applies to both vocal and musical instrument performance.

Purandara Dasa, the father of modern Carnatic music, developed learning exercises for students based on alankara and svaravali, where the student systematically repeats a certain set of patterns over three octave registers, across various ragas and talas.

== Types ==
A song without any alankara,
would be like a night without a moon,
a river devoid of water,
a vine without any flower,
and a woman without any ornament.

—Natya Shastra 29.75
Bharata Muni (200 BCE-200 CE)

Here are some common types of alankara used in classical music are

- meend, a technique of singing notes in a fluid manner with one note merging into the next - there are many different kinds of meend
- kan-swar, grace notes - the use of grace-notes depends on the raga being performed
- andolan, a gentle swing on specific notes, used selectively
- gamaka, a heavy to-and-fro oscillation involving two or three distinct notes
- khatka/gitkari, a rapid rendition of a cluster of notes distinctly yet lightly
- murki, an even lighter and more subtle rendition of a cluster of notes

== Other definitions ==
Alankara also refers to:

- a pattern on a svara group within a given octave, in ancient Indian music.
- a type of exercise based on the 7 main talas and their variations.
