= Conducting =

Art of directing a musical performance

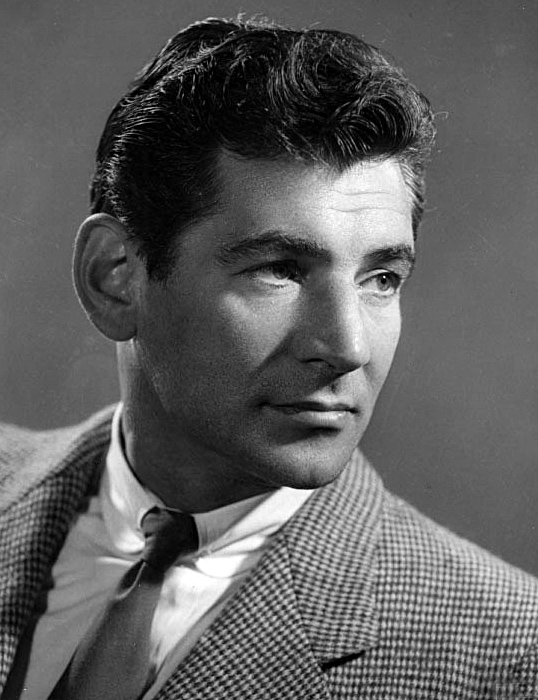
Leonard Bernstein, a 20th century conductor

Conducting is the art of directing a musical performance, such as an orchestral or choral concert. It has been defined as "the art of directing the simultaneous performance of several players or singers by the use of gesture". The main duties of the conductor are to interpret the score in a way that reflects the specific indications in that score, set the tempo, ensure correct entries by ensemble members, and "shape" the phrasing where appropriate. Conductors communicate with their musicians primarily through hand gestures, usually with the aid of a baton, and may use other gestures or signals such as facial expression and eye contact. A conductor usually supplements their direction with verbal instructions to their musicians in rehearsal.

The conductor typically stands on a raised podium with a large music stand for the full score, which contains the musical notation for all the instruments or voices. Since the mid-19th century, most conductors have not played an instrument when conducting, although in earlier periods of classical music history, leading an ensemble while playing an instrument was common. In Baroque music, the group would typically be led by the harpsichordist or first violinist (concertmaster), an approach that in modern times has been revived by several music directors for music from this period. Conducting while playing a piano or synthesizer may also be done with musical theatre pit orchestras. Instrumentalists may perform challenging works while conducting – for instance, it is not uncommon to see a pianist perform a concerto while also conducting the orchestra. Communication is typically non-verbal during a performance. However, in rehearsals, frequent interruptions allow the conductor to give verbal directions as to how music should be performed.

Conductors act as guides to the orchestras or choirs they conduct. They choose the works to be performed and study their scores, to which they may make certain adjustments (such as in tempo, articulation, phrasing, repetitions of sections), work out their interpretation, and relay their vision to the performers. They may also attend to organizational matters, such as scheduling rehearsals, planning a concert season, hearing auditions and selecting members, and promoting their ensemble in the media. Orchestras, choirs, concert bands, and other sizable musical ensembles, such as big bands are usually led by conductors.

== Nomenclature ==
The principal conductor of an orchestra or opera company is referred to as a music director, or chief conductor, or by the German words Kapellmeister, or Dirigent (in the feminine, Dirigentin). Conductors of choirs or choruses are sometimes referred to as choral director, chorus master, or choirmaster, particularly for choirs associated with an orchestra. Conductors of concert bands, military bands, marching bands and other bands may hold the title of band director, bandmaster, or drum major. Respected senior conductors are sometimes referred to by the Italian word maestro (feminine, maestra), which translates as "master" or "teacher".

== History ==
=== Middle Ages to 18th century ===
The beginnings of conducting as a form of beat-keeping can be traced back to ancient times in the Egyptian, Greek, and Roman societies. Through examining historical records – notably hieroglyphics – there is evidence that points to many early societies using visual and aural cuing to maintain a sense of beat, rhythm, and shape. The earliest documented forms of conducting arose out of a variety of musical needs in regions around the world.

An early example of using gesture to influence a performance was cheironomy. Documented as early as the 11th century, the practice entailed a leader using subtle motions of their fingers and/or hands to dictate melodic shape and contour. Typically a theme in vocal music, the practice predated many notated forms of rhythm and therefore acted as a way for performers to visually understand when to move together, although it was also used to memorize music.

As notated rhythm and beat, as well as more complex rhythmic figures, became more prominent in the early baroque era, performers relied on other indications to understand the intent behind their parts. Beginning in the sixteenth century, the role of the Kapellmeister in Germany was someone who audibly tapped the beat on a hard surface using a staff, rolled sheet of paper, or other object and took many other forms throughout Europe. Having an audible source of beat allowed ensemble members to maintain consistency and execute rhythms with precision before the invention of the metronome many years later.

In instrumental music throughout the 18th century, a member of the ensemble usually acted as the conductor. This was sometimes the concertmaster, who could use their bow, or a keyboard player (often harpsichordist) using their hands, who would direct the tempo/rhythm of the music in patterns similar to those we are familiar with today. Although effective in smaller ensembles, the increasing size of instrumental ensembles in opera and symphonic performances meant the players were increasingly less able to follow along. This was temporarily addressed by using two conductors, with the keyboard player in charge of the singers while the principal violinist or leader was in charge of the orchestra, however, this did not prove to be a sustainable effort in the long run. Moving out of the eighteenth century, it was clear that music was growing too complicated and performances too refined, to rely purely on aural skills to stay in time.

=== 19th century ===
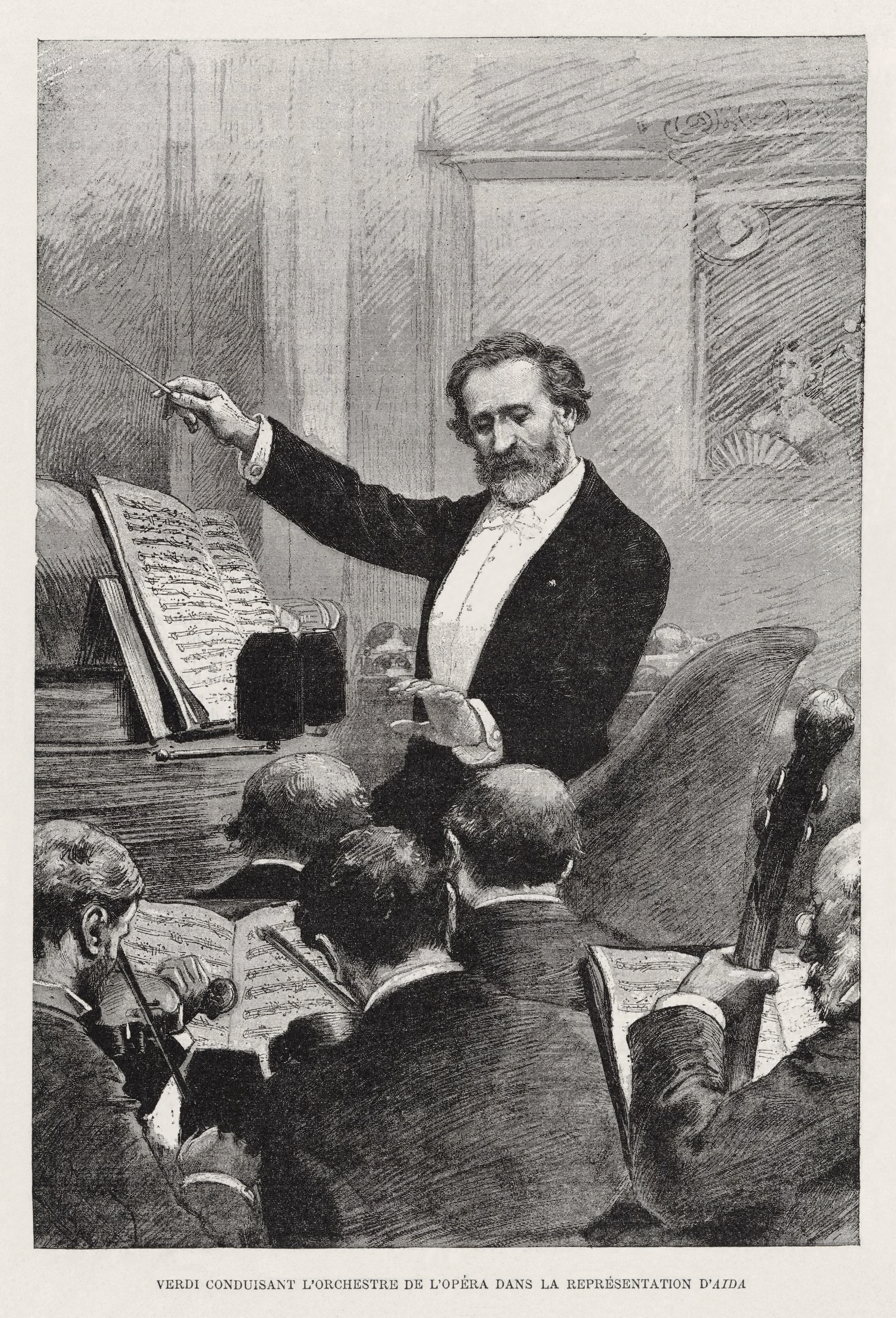
Giuseppe Verdi conducting his opera Aida in 1881

By around 1820, it became the norm to have a dedicated conductor who did not also play an instrument during the performance. While some orchestras protested against the introduction of the conductor, since they were used to having a concertmaster or keyboard player act as leader, eventually the role was established. The size of the usual orchestra expanded during this period, and the use of a baton became more common as it was easier to see than bare hands or rolled-up paper. Among the earliest notable conductors were Louis Spohr, Carl Maria von Weber, Louis-Antoine Jullien and Felix Mendelssohn, all of whom were also composers. Mendelssohn is claimed to have been the first conductor to use a wooden baton to keep time, a practice still generally in use today. Prominent conductors who did not or do not use a baton include Pierre Boulez, Kurt Masur, James Conlon, Yuri Temirkanov, Leopold Stokowski, Vasily Safonov, Eugene Ormandy (for a period), and Dimitri Mitropoulos.

The composers Hector Berlioz and Richard Wagner attained greatness as conductors, and they wrote two of the earliest essays dedicated to the subject. Berlioz is considered the first virtuoso conductor. Wagner was largely responsible for shaping the conductor's role as one who imposes his view of a piece onto the performance rather than one who is just responsible for ensuring entries are made at the right time and that there is a unified beat. Predecessors who focused on conducting include François Habeneck, who founded the Orchestre de la Société des concerts du Conservatoire in 1828, though Berlioz was later alarmed at Habeneck's loose standards of rehearsal. Pianist and composer Franz Liszt was also a conductor. Wagner's one-time champion Hans von Bülow (1830–1894) was particularly celebrated as a conductor, although he also maintained his initial career as a pianist, an instrument on which he was regarded as among the greatest performers.

Bülow raised the technical standards of conducting to an unprecedented level through such innovations as separate, detailed rehearsals of different sections of the orchestra ("sectional rehearsal"). In his posts as head of (sequentially) the Bavarian State Opera, Meiningen Court Orchestra, and Berlin Philharmonic he brought a level of nuance and subtlety to orchestral performance previously heard only in solo instrumental playing, and in doing so made a profound impression on young artists like Richard Strauss, who at age 20 served as his assistant, and Felix Weingartner, who came to disapprove of his interpretations but was deeply impressed by his orchestral standards. Composer Gustav Mahler was also a noted conductor.

=== 20th century ===
Technical standards were brought to new levels by the next generation of conductors, including Arthur Nikisch (1855–1922) who succeeded Bülow as music director of the Berlin Philharmonic in 1895. Nikisch premiered important works by Anton Bruckner and Pyotr Ilyich Tchaikovsky, who greatly admired his work; Johannes Brahms, after hearing him conduct his Fourth Symphony, said it was "quite exemplary, it's impossible to hear it any better." Nikisch took the London Symphony Orchestra on tour through the United States in April 1912, the first American tour by a European orchestra. He made one of the earliest recordings of a complete symphony: the Beethoven Fifth with the Berlin Philharmonic in November 1913. Nikisch was the first conductor to have his art captured on film—alas, silently. The film confirms reports that he made particularly mesmerizing use of eye contact and expression to communicate with an orchestra; such later conductors as Fritz Reiner stated that this aspect of his technique had a strong influence on their own.

Conductors of the generations after Nikisch often left extensive recorded evidence of their arts. Two particularly influential and widely recorded figures are often treated, somewhat inaccurately, as interpretive antipodes. They were the Italian conductor Arturo Toscanini (1867–1957) and the German conductor Wilhelm Furtwängler (1886–1954). Toscanini played in orchestras under Giuseppe Verdi and made his debut conducting Aida in 1886, filling in at the last minute for an indisposed conductor. He is to this day regarded by such authorities as James Levine as the greatest of all Verdi conductors. But Toscanini's repertory was wide, and it was in his interpretations of the German symphonists Beethoven and Brahms that he was particularly renowned and influential, favoring stricter and faster tempi than a conductor like Bülow or Wagner. Still, his style shows more inflection than his reputation may suggest, and he was particularly gifted at revealing detail and getting orchestras to play in a singing manner. Furtwängler, whom many regard as the greatest interpreter of Wagner (although Toscanini was also admired in this composer) and Bruckner, conducted Beethoven and Brahms with a good deal of inflection of tempo—but generally in a manner that revealed the structure and direction of the music particularly clearly. He was an accomplished composer as well as performer; and he was a disciple of the theorist Heinrich Schenker, who emphasized concern for underlying long-range harmonic tensions and resolutions in a piece, a strength of Furtwängler's conducting. Along with his interest in the large-scale, Furtwängler also shaped the details of the piece in a particularly compelling and expressive manner.

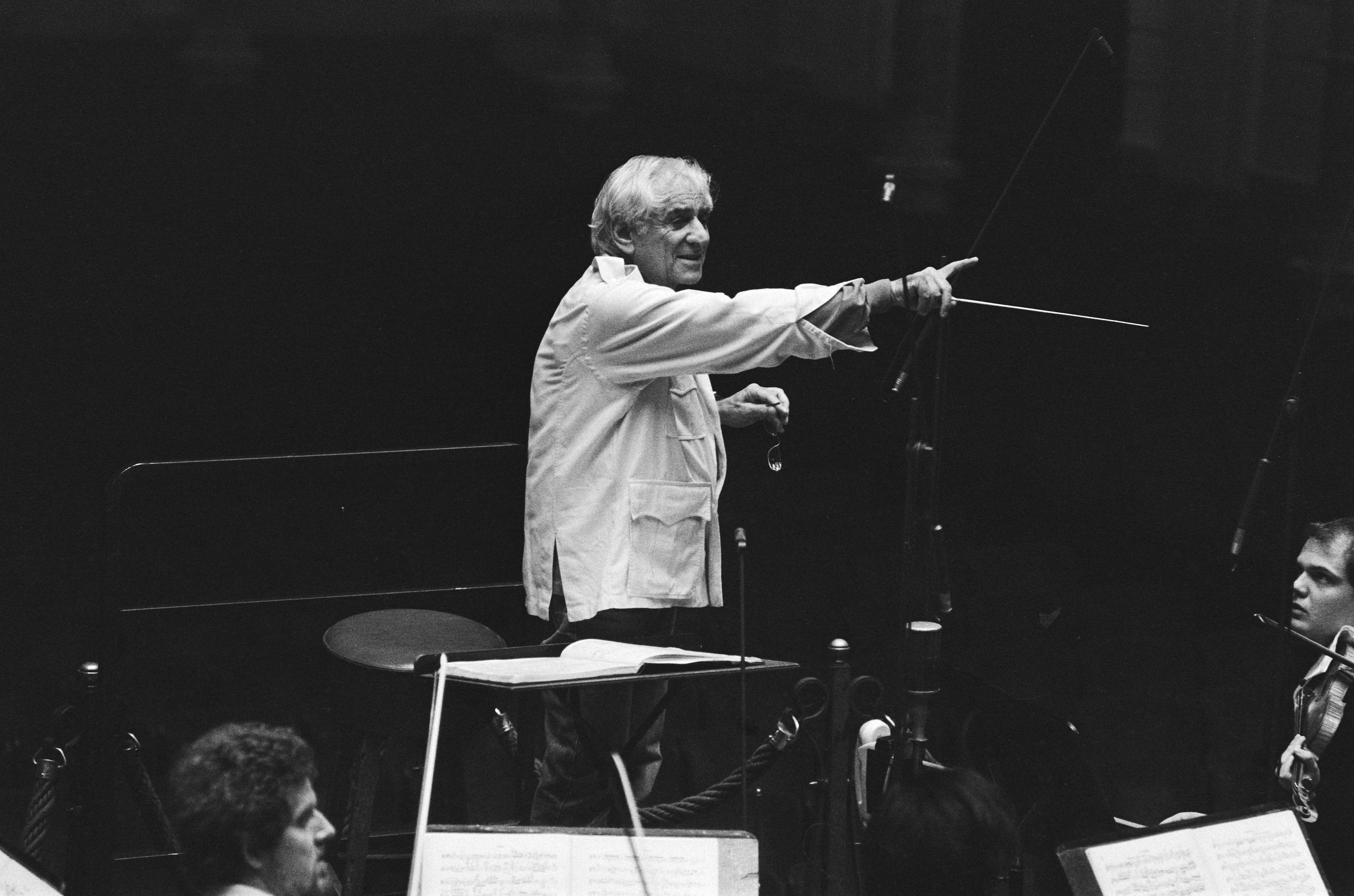
Leonard Bernstein conducting the Royal Concertgebouw Orchestra in 1985

The two men had very different techniques: Toscanini's was Italianate, with a long, large baton and clear beats (often not using his left hand); Furtwängler beat time with less apparent precision, because he wanted a more rounded sound (although it is a myth that his technique was vague; many musicians have attested that he was easy to follow in his own way). In any event, their examples illustrate a larger point about conducting technique in the first half of the 20th century: it was not standardized. Great and influential conductors of the middle 20th century like Leopold Stokowski (1882–1977), Otto Klemperer (1885–1973), Herbert von Karajan (1908–1989) and Leonard Bernstein (1918–1990)—the first American conductor to attain greatness and international fame—had widely varied techniques.

Karajan and Bernstein formed another apparent antipode in the 1960s–80s, Karajan as music director of the Berlin Philharmonic (1955–89) and Bernstein as music director of the New York Philharmonic (1957–69) and later frequent guest conductor in Europe. Karajan's technique was highly controlled, and eventually he conducted with his eyes often closed, as he often memorized scores; Bernstein's technique was demonstrative, with highly expressive facial gestures and hand and body movements; when conducting vocal music, Bernstein would often mouth the words along with the vocalists. Karajan could conduct for hours without moving his feet, while Bernstein was known at times to leap into the air at a great climax. As the music director of the Berlin Philharmonic, Karajan cultivated warm, blended beauty of tone, which has sometimes been criticized as too uniformly applied; by contrast, in Bernstein's only appearance with the Berlin Philharmonic in 1979—performing Mahler's Symphony No. 9—he tried to get the orchestra to produce an "ugly" tone in a certain passage in which he believed it suited the expressive meaning of the music (the first horn player refused and finally agreed to let an understudy play instead of himself).

Both Karajan and Bernstein made extensive use of advances in media to convey their art, but in tellingly different ways. Bernstein hosted major prime-time national television series to educate and reach out to children and the public at large about classical music; Karajan made a series of films late in his life, but in them he did not talk. Both made numerous recordings, but their attitudes toward recording differed: Karajan frequently made new studio recordings to take advantage of advances in recording technique, which fascinated him—he played a role in setting the specifications of the compact disc—but Bernstein, in his post-New York days, came to insist on (for the most part) live concert recordings, believing that music-making did not come to life in a studio without an audience.

In the last third of the 20th century, conducting technique—particularly with the right hand and the baton—became increasingly standardized. Conductors like Willem Mengelberg in Amsterdam until the end of World War II had had extensive rehearsal time to mold orchestras very precisely and thus could have idiosyncratic techniques; modern conductors, who spend less time with any given orchestra, must get results with much less rehearsal time. A more standardized technique allows communication to be much more rapid. Nonetheless, conductors' techniques still show a great deal of variety, particularly with the use of the left hand, facial and eye expression, and body language.

=== 21st century ===
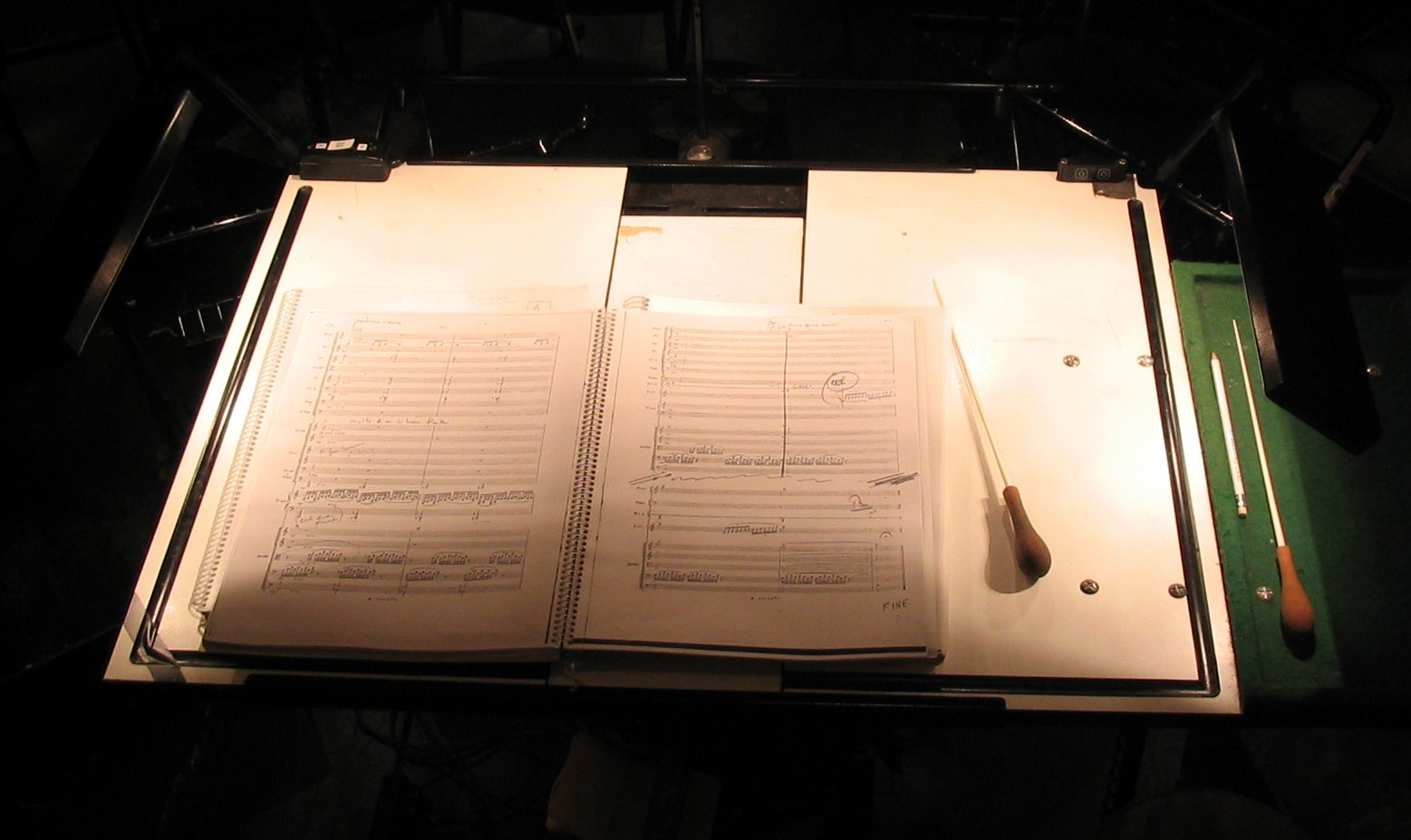
Conductor's score and batons on a lit, extra-large conductor's music stand

Women conductors were almost unheard of in the ranks of leading orchestral conductors through most of the 19th and 20th centuries. One of the first was Soviet conductor Veronika Dudarova. In 1947, Dudarova was appointed principal conductor of the Moscow State Symphony Orchestra and led the orchestra until 1989. She led the Symphony Orchestra of Russia from 1991 to 2003 and retained the role of artistic manager of the orchestra until her death in Moscow in January 2009.

Today, artists like Hortense von Gelmini, Marin Alsop and Simone Young lead orchestras. Alsop was appointed music director of the Baltimore Symphony Orchestra in 2007—the first woman appointed to head a major U.S. orchestra—and also of the Orquestra Sinfônica do Estado de São Paulo in 2012, and Alsop was the first woman to conduct on the last night of The Proms. Young scored similar firsts when she became head of the Hamburg State Opera and Philharmoniker Hamburg in 2005; she is also the first woman conductor to record the Ring Cycle of Richard Wagner. The Guardian called conducting "one of the last glass ceilings in the music industry". A 2013 article states that in France, out of 574 concerts only 17 were conducted by women and no women conducted at the National Opéra in Paris. "Bachtrack reported that in a list of the world's 150 top conductors that year, only five were women." While Mexico has produced several major international conductors, Alondra de la Parra has become the first Mexican-born woman to attain distinction in the profession. In Italy in 2016, 22-year-old Beatrice Venezi became the principal conductor of the Nuova Orchestra Scarlatti Young.

Similarly, conductors of East Asian descent have become more prominent within the contemporary orchestral landscape—notably Seiji Ozawa who was thematic director of the Boston Symphony Orchestra from 1973 until 2002 after holding similar posts in San Francisco and Toronto. Myung-Whun Chung, who has held major posts in Germany and France, is bringing the Seoul Philharmonic Orchestra to international attention. Notable black conductors include Henry Lewis, Dean Dixon, James DePreist, Paul Freeman, and Michael Morgan. According to Charlotte Higgins' 2004 article in The Guardian, "black conductors are rare in the classical music world and even in symphony orchestras it is unusual to see more than one or two black musicians".

== Technique ==
Conducting is a means of communicating artistic directions to performers during a performance. Although there are many formal rules on how to conduct correctly, others are subjective, and a wide variety of different conducting styles exist depending upon the training and sophistication of the conductor. The primary responsibilities of the conductor are to unify performers, set the tempo, execute clear preparations and beats, listen critically and shape the sound of the ensemble, and control the interpretation and pacing of the music. Communication is non-verbal during a performance; however, in rehearsal frequent interruptions allow directions as to how the music should be played. During rehearsals the conductor may stop the playing of a piece to request changes in the phrasing or request a change in the timbre of a certain section. In amateur orchestras, the rehearsals are often stopped to draw the musicians' attentions to performance errors or transposition mistakes.

Conducting requires an understanding of the elements of musical expression (tempo, dynamics, articulation) and the ability to communicate them effectively to an ensemble. The ability to communicate nuances of phrasing and expression through gestures is also beneficial. Conducting gestures are preferably prepared beforehand by the conductor while studying the score but may sometimes be spontaneous. A distinction is sometimes made between orchestral conducting and choral conducting. Typically, orchestral conductors use a baton more often than choral conductors. The grip of the baton varies from conductor to conductor.

=== Beat and tempo ===
At the beginning of a piece of music, the conductor raises their hands (or hand if they only use a single hand) to indicate that the piece is about to begin. This is a signal for the orchestra members to ready their instruments to be played or for the choristers to be ready and watching. The conductor then looks at the different sections of the orchestra (winds, strings, etc.) or choir to ensure that all the orchestra members are ready to play and choir members are ready. In some choral works, the conductor may signal to a pianist or organist to play a note or chord so that the choir members can determine their starting notes. Then the conductor gives one or more preparatory beats to commence the music. The preparatory beat before the orchestra or choir begins is the upbeat. The beat of the music is typically indicated with the conductor's right hand, with or without a baton. The hand traces a shape in the air in every bar (measure) depending on the time signature, indicating each beat with a change from downward to upward motion.

The downbeat indicates the first beat of the bar, and the upbeat indicates the beat before the first note of the piece and the last beat of the bar. The instant at which the beat occurs is called the ictus (plural: ictūs or ictuses) and is usually indicated by a sudden (though not necessarily large) click of the wrist or change in baton direction. In some instances, "ictus" is also used to refer to a horizontal plane in which all the ictuses are physically located, such as the top of a music stand where a baton is tapped at each ictus. The gesture leading up to the ictus is called the "preparation", and the continuous flow of steady beats is called the "takt" (the German word for bar, measure and beat).

If the tempo is slow or slowing, or if the time signature is compound, a conductor will sometimes indicate "subdivisions" of the beats. The conductor can do this by adding a smaller movement in the same direction as the movement for the beat that it belongs to.

Changes to the tempo are indicated by changing the speed of the beat. To carry out and to control a rallentando (slowing down the pace of the music), a conductor may introduce beat subdivisions. While some conductors use both hands to indicate the beat, with the left hand mirroring the right, formal education discourages such an approach. The second hand can be used for cueing the entrances of individual players or sections and to aid indications of dynamics, phrasing, expression, and other elements.

During an instrumental solo section (or, in an opera orchestra during a vocalist's unaccompanied solo), some conductors stop counting out all the subdivisions and simply tap the baton down once per bar, to aid performers who are counting bars of rests.

There is a difference between the "textbook" definition of where the ictus of a downbeat occurs and the actual performance practice in professional orchestras. With an abrupt, loud sforzando chord, a professional orchestra will often play slightly after the striking of the ictus point of the baton stroke.

=== Dynamics ===
Dynamics are indicated in various ways. The dynamic may be communicated by the size of the conducting movements, larger shapes representing louder sounds. Changes in dynamic may be signalled with the second hand to indicate the beat: an upward motion (usually palm-up) indicates a crescendo; a downward motion (usually palm-down) indicates a diminuendo. Changing the size of conducting movements frequently results in changes in the character of the music depending upon the circumstances. Dynamics can be fine-tuned using various gestures: showing one's palm to the performers or leaning away from them may demonstrate a decrease in volume. To adjust the overall balance of the various instruments or voices, these signals can be combined or directed toward a particular section or performer.

=== Cueing ===
The indication of entries, when a performer or section should begin playing (perhaps after a long period of rests), is called "cueing". A cue must forecast with certainty the exact moment of the coming ictus, so that all the players or singers affected by the cue can begin playing simultaneously. Cueing is most important for cases where a performer or section has not been playing for a lengthy time. Cueing is also helpful in the case of a pedal point with string players, when a section has been playing the pedal point for a lengthy period; a cue is important to indicate when they should change to a new note. Cueing is achieved by "engaging" the players before their entry (by looking at them) and executing a clear preparation gesture, often directed toward the specific players. An inhalation, which may or may not be an audible "sniff" from the conductor, is a common element in the cueing technique of some conductors. Mere eye contact or a look in the general direction of the players may be sufficient in many instances, as when more than one section of the ensemble enters at the same time. Larger musical events may warrant the use of a larger or more emphatic cue designed to encourage emotion and energy.

=== Other musical elements ===
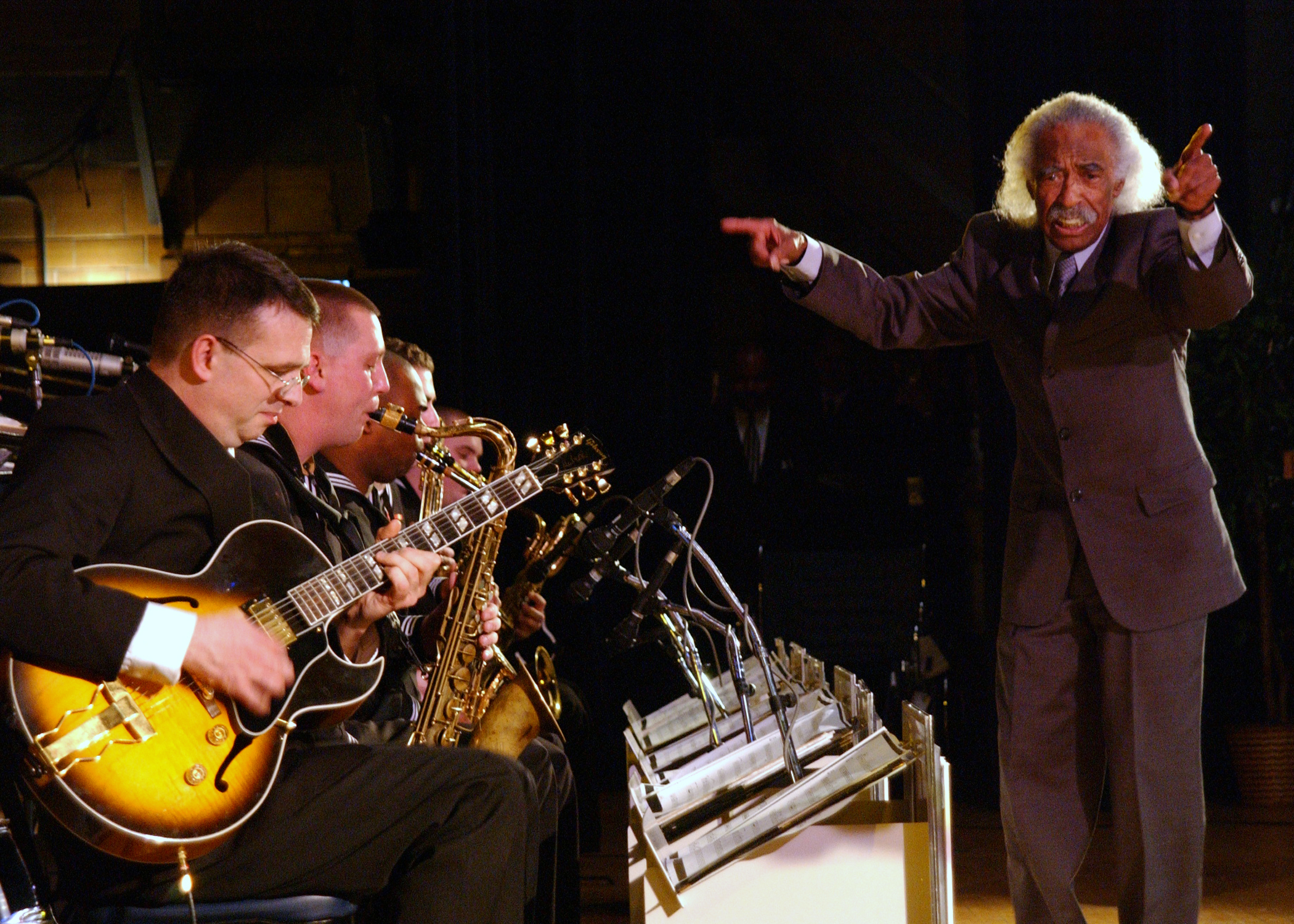
Gerald Wilson leads a jazz big band.

Articulation may be indicated by the character of the ictus, ranging from short and sharp for staccato, to long and fluid for legato. Many conductors change the tension of the hands: strained muscles and rigid movements may correspond to marcato, while relaxed hands and soft movements may correspond to legato or espressivo. Phrasing may be indicated by wide overhead arcs or by a smooth hand motion either forwards or side-to-side. A held note is often indicated by a hand held flat with palm up. The end of a note, called a "cutoff" or "release", may be indicated by a circular motion, the closing of the palm, or the pinching of finger and thumb. A release is usually preceded by a preparation and concluded with a complete stillness.

Conductors aim to maintain eye contact with the ensemble as much as possible, encouraging eye contact in return and increasing the dialogue between players/singers and conductor. Facial expressions may also be important to demonstrate the character of the music or to encourage the players. In some cases, such as where there has been little rehearsal time to prepare a piece, a conductor may discreetly indicate how the bars of music will be beat immediately before the start of the movement by holding up their fingers in front of their chest (so only the performers can see). For example, in a 4/4 piece that the conductor will beat "in two" (two ictus points, or beats, per bar, as if it were 2/2), the conductor would hold up two fingers in front of their chest.

In most cases, there is a short pause between movements of a symphony, concerto or dance suite. This brief pause gives orchestra or choir members time to turn the pages of their part and ready themselves for the start of the next movement. String players may apply rosin or wipe sweat off their hands with a handkerchief. Reed players may take this time to change to a new reed. In some cases, woodwind or brass players will use the pause to switch to a different instrument (e.g., from trumpet to cornet or from clarinet to E♭ clarinet). If the conductor wishes to immediately begin one movement after another for musical reasons, this is called attacca. The conductor will instruct the orchestra members and choristers to write the term in their parts, so that they will be ready to go immediately to the next movement.

== Field conducting ==
When a marching band is performing a field show, there will typically be a drum major conducting the band. This is known as field conducting.

=== Conducting patterns ===
Drum majors may each have a different style of conducting. Some may be smoother, but others are more rigid. The most commonly used pattern is called the "Down-in-out-up" pattern. The pattern is shown by the first beat being straight down and normal. The second beat goes down then after the focal point it goes in a 45-degree angle to the inside. The third beat is when the arm is coming back from the angle to the focal point at the angle and hits the point and goes to the outside at the same 45-degree angle. The last beat, fourth, goes from the outside angle back to the focal point. Then the process repeats. It is typical for drum majors to use smaller, simpler patterns to accommodate faster tempos for endurance and clarity, emphasizing beats 1 and 3 and minimizing beats 2 and 4.

=== Controlling tempo ===
What is "appropriate" conducting has evolved over the decades. During the 1970s and prior it was not uncommon for a stationary drum major to do a high-lift mark time on the podium for an audible and visual tempo; with the arrival of increasingly higher drum major platforms and thus greater visibility this has become both dangerous and unnecessary. Current drum majors use a variety of conducting patterns and styles that suit the needs of their respective marching bands and/or drum corps.

=== Assisting musicality ===
In addition to memorizing the music (between six and nine minutes of music is typical for high school marching bands, college bands and drum corps may have that much or more, up to more than eleven minutes of music) a drum major must memorize dynamics as well as tempo in order to provide proper direction and cues, particularly in area where the drum major has some discretion, such as a ritardando or fermata.

== Roles ==
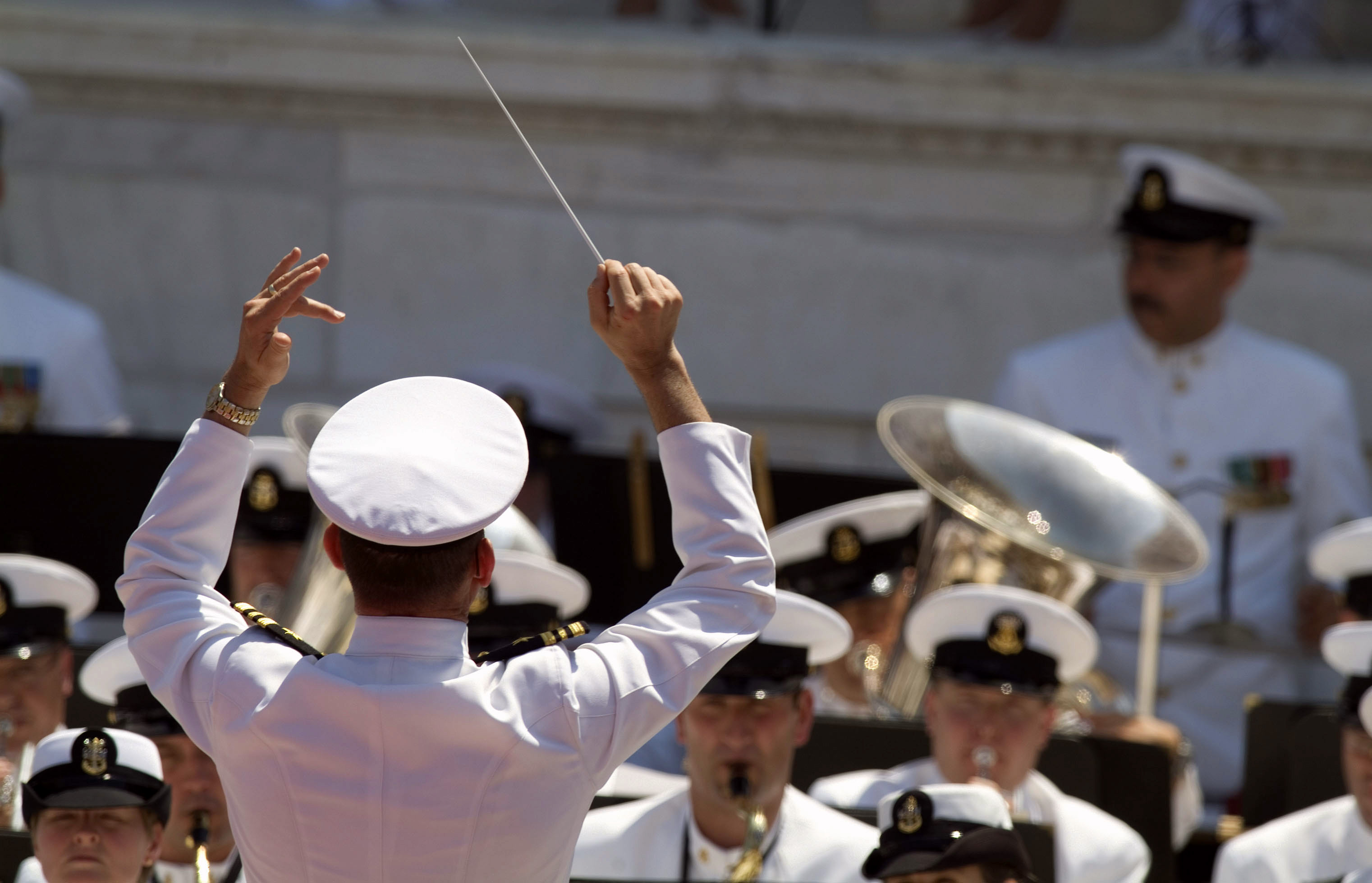
A military conductor leads the U.S. Navy band during Memorial Day ceremonies held at Arlington National Cemetery.

The roles of a conductor vary a great deal between different conducting positions and different ensembles. In some cases, a conductor will also be the musical director of the symphony, choosing the program for the entire season, including concerts by guest conductors, concerto soloists, pop concerts, and so on. A senior conductor may attend some or all of the auditions for new members of the orchestra, to ensure that the candidates have the playing style and tone that the conductor prefers and that candidates meet the performance standards. Some choral conductors are hired to prepare a choir for several weeks which will subsequently be directed by another conductor. The choral conductor is usually acknowledged for their preparatory work in the concert program.

Some conductors may have a significant public relations role, giving interviews to the local news channel and appearing on television talk shows to promote the upcoming season or particular concerts. On the other hand, a conductor hired to guest conduct a single concert may only have the responsibility of rehearsing the orchestra for several pieces and conducting one or two concerts. While a handful of conductors have become well-known celebrities, such as Leonard Bernstein, most are only known within the classical music scene.

== Training and education ==
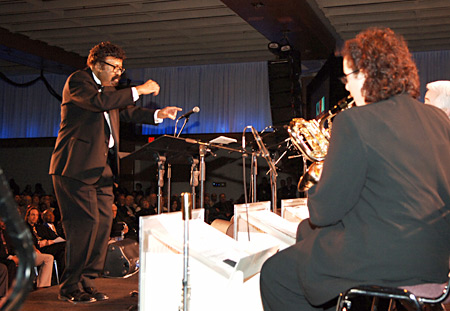
David Baker (far left), a music educator, composer and conductor, leads the Smithsonian Jazz Masterworks Orchestra during the NEA Jazz Masters awards ceremony and concert in 2008.

Classical choral and instrumental conducting have established comprehensive systems of instruction and training. Aspiring conductors can study at colleges, conservatories, and universities. Music schools and universities offer a range of conducting programs, including courses in conducting as part of bachelor's degrees, a small number of master of music degrees in conducting, and an even smaller number of doctor of musical arts degrees in conducting. In addition, there are a variety of other training programs such as classical summer camps and training festivals, which give students the opportunity to conduct a wide range of music. Aspiring conductors need to obtain a broad education about the history of music, including the major periods of classical music and regarding music theory. Many conductors learn to play a keyboard instrument such as the piano or the pipe organ, a skill that helps them to be able to analyze symphonies and try out their interpretations before they have access to an orchestra to conduct. Many conductors get experience playing in an orchestra or singing in a choir, an experience which gives them good insights into how orchestras and choirs are conducted and rehearsed.

Orchestra conductors typically hold a master's degree in music, and choir conductors in the U.S. typically hold a bachelor's degree in music. Bachelor's degrees (referred to as B.Mus. or B.M) are four-year programs that include conducting lessons, amateur orchestra experience, and a sequence of courses in music history, music theory, and liberal arts courses (e.g., English literature), which give the student a more well-rounded education. Students do not usually specialize in conducting at the B.Mus. stage; instead, they usually develop general music skills such as singing, playing an orchestral instrument, performing in a choir, playing in orchestra, and playing a keyboard instrument such as the piano or the organ.

Another topic that conducting students study is the languages used in classical music opera. Orchestral conductors are expected to be able to rehearse and lead choirs in works for orchestra and choir. As such, orchestral conductors need to know the major languages used in choral writing (including French, Italian and Latin, among others) and they must understand the correct diction of these languages in a choral singing context. The opposite is also true: a choral conductor will be expected to rehearse and lead a string orchestra or full orchestra when performing works for choir and orchestra. As such, a choral conductor needs to know how to rehearse and lead instrument sections.

Master of music degrees (M.mus. or M.M.) in conducting consist of private conducting lessons, ensemble experience, coaching, and graduate courses in music history and music theory, along with one or two conducted concerts. A M.mus. is often the required minimum credential for people who wish to become a professor of conducting. Doctor of musical arts (referred to as D.M.A., DMA, D.Mus.A. or A.Mus.D) degrees in conducting provide an opportunity for advanced study at the highest artistic and pedagogical level, requiring usually an additional 54+ credit hours beyond a master's degree (which is about 30+ credits beyond a bachelor's degree). For this reason, admission is highly selective. Examinations in music history, music theory, ear training/dictation, and an entrance examination and conducting audition are required. Students perform conducted concerts, including a combination lecture-conducted concert with an accompanying doctoral dissertation, and advanced coursework. Students must typically maintain a minimum B average. A DMA in conducting is a terminal degree and as such qualifies the holder to teach in colleges, universities and conservatories. In addition to academic study, another part of the training pathway for many conductors is conducting amateur orchestras, such as youth orchestras, school orchestras and community orchestras.

A small number of conductors become professionals without formal training in conducting. These individuals often have achieved renown as instrumental or vocal performers, and they have often undertaken a great deal of training in their area of expertise (instrumental performance or singing). Some conductors learn on the job by conducting amateur orchestras, school orchestras, and community orchestras (or the equivalent choral ensembles).

The median salary of conductors in the U.S. in 2021 was $49,130. A 5% growth rate is forecast for conducting jobs from 2021 to 2031, an average growth rate.

== See also ==
- Conductorless orchestra
- List of principal conductors by orchestra
