= Col legno =

Using the back of the bow to play a string instrument

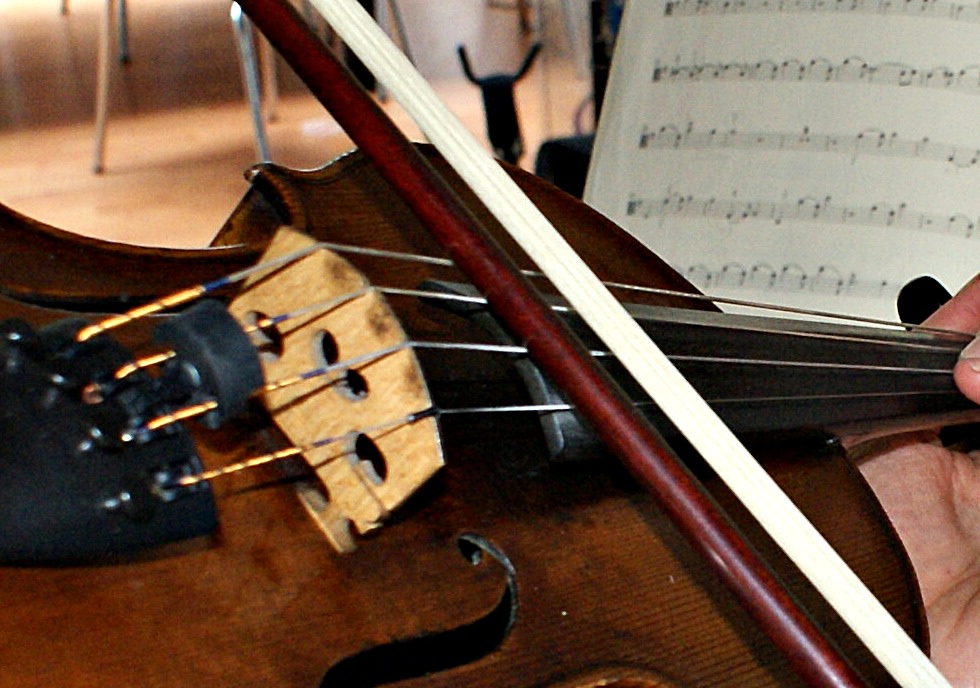
A violin being played col legno.

In music for bowed string instruments, col legno (pronounced [kol ˈleɲɲo] kol LEN-yoh, also /kol lɛɡnəʊ/ kol LEG-noh, translated roughly as 'with the wood') is an instruction to use the stick of the bow to make contact with the strings, rather than the string or hair of the bow, which is how bowed string instruments are usually played. The sound created from playing col legno is considerably different from the regular arco bowing, with an audibly distinct timbre.

Col legno is largely associated with the avant-garde genre, despite having been used since the classical and baroque periods. Composers that have used col legno in their works include Gustav Holst, Louis-Hector Berlioz, and Camille Saint-Saëns; usually to create threatening or macabre sounds, due to the coarse sound of col legno (especially battuto). It is considered an extended technique for bowed string instruments, mainly in an orchestral context, so being played on violin, viola, violoncello, and double bass.

Col legno on violin
0 sec: battuto
9 sec: tratto
20 sec: tratto with tremolo
33 sec: tratto with glissando
48 sec: battuto with movement of the bow across the fingerboard

Col legno is performed by rotating the stick so it touches the strings. There are two primary variants of col legno: battuto (the most common technique) is the action of percussively hitting the strings, and tratto is the action of bowing across the strings using the wood. There are, however, various other forms used in experimental music, combining col legno with other techniques.

== Usage ==
=== Early usage ===
The earliest known use of col legno in Western music is found in a piece entitled "Harke, harke" from the First Part of Ayres (1605) by Tobias Hume. He instructs the gambist to "drum this with the [back] (Note: Originally 'backe' (pronounced /ˈbæke/: old English)) of your bow". Another early usage was in Capriccio Stravagante, a 1627 chamber piece by Carlo Farina, where he notes "here one strikes the strings with the wood of the bow", implying col legno.

The earliest usage of the term col legno in a piece's manuscript was in Heinrich Ignaz Franz von Biber's La Battalia Sinfonia (1673). In an attempt to portray the sounds of battle, he uses percussive effects in the string section, including col legno. From there, the technique gained prominence and became standard through integration in the classical period and even more so in the 19th and 20th centuries, as composers recognised the capacity of col legno to enrich the string sound palette.

=== Other notable usages ===
- Wolfgang Amadeus Mozart, 'Turkish' Violin Concerto No. 5, imitating a percussive drone in Turkish music.
- Franz Joseph Haydn, Symphony No. 67, where at the end he comically repeats the opening phrase col legno.
- Fryderyk Chopin, Piano Concerto No. 2, mimicking a mazurka in the third movement (Allegro Vivace).
- Louis-Hector Berlioz, Symphonie fantastique, mimicking the sound of skeletons dancing.
- Camille Saint-Saëns, Danse Macabre, imitating the rattling of skeleton bones.
- Gustav Holst, The Planets Suite's first movement—the strings play an ostinato rhythm in unison, adding an unsteady menace to the beginning of the piece.

Holst, The Planets, Op. 32 - I. Mars, the Bringer of War
The opening of Mars, The Bringer of War from Gustav Holst's The Planets Suite, in which the strings can be heard playing col legno.

- Igor Stravinsky, The Firebird, adding the illusion of depth and breadth to The Firebird's Pleading.
- Dmitri Shostakovich, Symphony No. 7 "Leningrad", producing an effect of distance or peace, in combination with pizzicato and arco strings in the first movement.
- Dmitri Shostakovich, Symphony No. 11, portraying martial and violent imagery.
- Sergei Rachmaninoff, Piano Concerto No. 3, adding a brittle undertone during a virtuosic piano cadenza in the third movement.

== Variations of col legno ==
String players can make the bow wood interact with the strings in multiple ways. All of the following variants of col legno can be used alongside sul ponticello, sul tasto, and be played behind the bridge (sub ponticello).

=== Battuto ===
Col legno battuto (Note: Italian pronunciation: [batˈtuːto]; English pronunciation: /bəˈtutoʊ/ bə-TOO-toh also /ˈbættʌttəʊ/ BA-tuu-toh. Literally 'beaten' in Italian) is the most common form of col legno. Battuto involves striking the wood of the bow onto the strings, creating a percussive effect. Battuto is said to be more effective and characteristic in the lower registers of the string section, since in higher registers the tone of the note being played battuto is usually negated, only leaving the percussive 'click' sound.

==== Technique ====
To perform col legno battuto, the bow is rotated so that the wooden stick of the bow faces (and so can strike) the strings. The contact point of the bow to the strings is typically closer to the middle of the bow; neither nearer the tip nor the frog. The action of striking the string is rhythmic and similar to a drumming action, not held onto the string for long.

==== Sound ====
Distinctly dry, percussive, and sometimes ghostly, the sound made by the 'click' of battuto has a clear pitch element determined by the distance of the bow from the bridge at the point of contact, however the pitch of the stopped note is rarely definite or audible. As a group of players will never strike the string in exactly the same place, the sound of a section of strings playing col legno battuto is dramatically different from the sound of a single string instrument doing so. The timbre of battuto is unique and subtle, as there is no percussion instrument that can readily reproduce its accented sound.

=== Tratto ===
Col legno tratto (Note: Italian pronunciation: [ˈtratto]; English pronunciation: /tʁaːto/ TRAH-toh also /tʁæːto/ TRA-toh. Literally 'drawn' in Italian) is a much rarer version of col legno; so much so that Gustav Mahler included a note in the third movement of his First Symphony: "No mistake! to be stroked with the wood". Tratto also occurs in many works of the Second Viennese School, such as Anton Friedrich Wilhelm von Webern's Four Pieces for Violin and Piano, Op. 7, Alban Berg's Lyric Suite, and Arnold Schoenberg's Moses und Aaron, as well as other more contemporary and avant-garde pieces.

==== Technique ====
Executing tratto is similar to executing battuto, in that the contact is still between the wooden part of the bow and the strings, however in tratto the bow is dragged—or 'painted'—across the strings. Control of the bow speed and pressure is critical for sound clarity and consistency whilst playing tratto, but intonation of the stopped note is considered to be 'of secondary importance'.

==== Sound ====
The sound produced by col legno tratto is very quiet and muted, with white noise, and is sometimes used to create eerie sounds, but the pitch of the stopped note can be clearly heard amongst the 'scratching'. The sound is sometimes considered to be too quiet or 'airy' in a performance setting.

=== Half tratto ===
Half tratto (Note: Or 1/2 tratto, also called half legno, col legno arco or quasi col legno) is a version of col legno tratto involving bowing with half of the bow hair and half of the bow stick. This can be used to transition between col legno tratto and arco, as well as during a standalone passage.

Half battuto is also sometimes used, following the principles of half tratto, but playing battuto instead.

In pure col legno, the bow hair is not used, but the edge of the hair can be allowed to contact the string along with the wood so that a more discernable pitch can be heard in the col legno colour.

==== Technique ====
Half tratto is achieved by, instead of turning the bow 180 degrees (so that the wood directly faces the strings), it turned at a slighter angle (around 90 degrees). This allows both the hair and the wood to make contact with the string in part.

Sources conflict as to whether the rotation of the bow is with the hair facing the player or with the wood facing the player. (Note: Sources saying the bow hair should face the player:) (Note: Sources saying the bow wood should face the player:)

==== Sound ====
Since both the wood and hair make contact with the string in half tratto, the sound made is clearer and louder than when playing fully tratto. For this reason, players often use half tratto to project more in performance. Half tratto also creates a distinct timbre to regular bowing, as well as a clear pitch.

=== Gettato ===
Col legno gettato (Note: Italian pronunciation: [dʒetˈtaːto]; English pronunciation: /ˌgɛˈtɑːtoʊ/ ge-TAH-toh. Literally 'thrown' in Italian) is essentially a combination of the technique ricochet or jeté with col legno battuto. This technique is used to play several notes in quick succession in one bow stroke; usually this is several reiterations of the same pitch, instead of a melodic line. Although the bounce of regular col legno battuto does give a similar 'quasi-jeté' sound, gettato is distinct in its repetitive nature. Col legno gettato is exceptionally uncommon, found only in extended, experimental, or modern repertoire.

==== Technique ====
The technique to execute gettato is exactly the same to that of ricochet only with the bow's wood facing the strings. The bow is lightly tossed against the strings and allowed to bounce, producing several reiterations of pitch. Gettato is primarily executed on the bow's upper third for smoother down-bowing. The speed and height of the bounce can be adjusted by the pressure of the index finger and where the bow first makes contact with the string: closer to the frog of the bow for slower bounces and towards the middle or tip for quicker ones. Gettato is applied when groups of pitches after an initial attack are grouped together—the notation for this is a slur over the repeated notes, or a tremolo under battuto. (Note: See also notation.)

==== Sound ====
The sound of gettato is, naturally, simply battuto but with rapid reiteration. Through this, its texture is more articulated and rhythmic, so to create a sense of movement rather than that of static. Violinist Tomás Cotik described ricochet by itself as "[sounding] like extended teeth chattering", so col legno gettato can only be more so.

== Notation ==
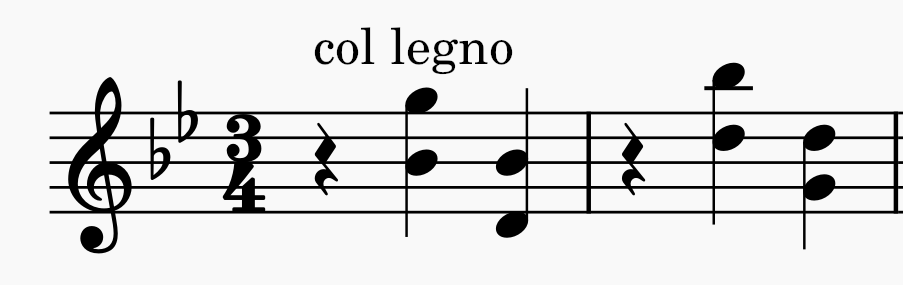
Col legno indicated above the staff. Battuto is usually assumed as the specific technique is not indicated.

To direct the bowed string player to play col legno, "col legno [battuto/tratto]" is written directly above the staff at the point of which it is to be played col legno. Col legno is sometimes abbreviated to "c.l." or "C.L.", sometimes with an added "t." or "b." for tratto or battuto, respectively. The technique is assumed until "arco" (Note: Or equivalent: "naturale", "modo ordino", "ordinary", "normale", etc.) is written directly above the staff, indicating the player to return to regular bowing.

In addition, col legno battuto is sometimes indicated via altered noteheads—including x-shaped, square, or triangle—from the rest of the piece. Used mostly in conjunction with the staff text, these noteheads are used primarily in cases of frequent switching between arco and col legno, and therefore most prominent in modern and avant-garde music.

As col legno battuto is significantly more common than col legno tratto, performers assume to play battuto even when only "col legno" is written, except in cases where it is clear tratto was intended over battuto; for example when the passage contains long, sustained notes. However, it is recommended to specify whether battuto or tratto is intended.

This notation of gettato is unconventional—it has a tremolo notation, while also containing rhythmical directions above it. The slashes through the first of each group of beams, however, imply an acciaccatura-like execution of gettato, meaning fast and without rhythmic specification.

Col legno gettato notated with smaller noteheads to be played ricochet preceded by the note with the main attack. Notice that only col legno (or 'cl') has to be written above the notation.

Col legno gettato can be notated with a slur over the reiterations of the note, marked staccato. The repetitions of the note are sometimes written with smaller noteheads, to indicate that the initial attack is followed by less forceful repetitions of the same note. Moreover, sometimes a tremolo notation is used to indicate a continuous gettato; the latter usually has more rhythmic freedom, similar to how a bowed tremolo is not rhythmically specific. There are also other even less frequent examples of notation, an example of which is combining the tremolo over the longer note with a rhythmic guide immediately above it, showing how fast the ricochet should be played.

== Presence in aleatoric music ==
Col legno cluster
A string section playing col legno ad lib., making a cluster effect.

Col legno is a technique often used in aleatoric music. When directing a string section to play col legno (usually battuto) ad libitum, the effect created is a "grainy percussive materiality," and "a sense of turmoil, of things quickly rushing past." In modern classical music and avant-garde music, aleatoric techniques are employed even more frequently, using the notation of an aleatoric cell: (Note: Also called an aleatoric box) a box on the staff containing a short figure to be repeated at the tempo of the performer's choice, preferably at a rhythm or tempo differing to the other players in the performance.

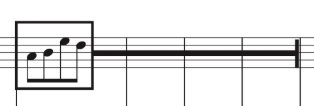
An aleatoric cell. The notation in the box is repeated at the tempo of the player's choice for the duration indicated by the thick line.

The aleatoric device of ad libitum col legno combines the coarse, woody timbre of col legno with the chaotic nature of ad lib. playing, which naturally creates tone clusters due to the unpredictable nature of a section of strings essentially improvising.

In orchestral sound samplers, catalogues, and online toolkits, aleatoric technique and texture samples are found commonly, used mostly to create distinctly dissonant soundscapes or horror music. Often included in these catalogues are col legno clusters, in which a section of strings perform col legno battuto ad libitum.

=== Film music ===
This aleatoric device of col legno clusters is found in film music, particularly in the horror genre. This technique is often used to evoke tense scenarios, the sound of dripping or clattering, or even insects and arachnids.

Films that incorporate aleatoric col legno in their soundtracks include:

- Alien (1974), Jerry Goldsmith
- Aliens (1986), James Horner
- The Red Violin (1998), John Corigliano
- There Will Be Blood (2007), Jonny Greenwood
- The Master (2012), Jonny Greenwood
- Interstellar (2014), Hans Zimmer
- Hereditary (2018), Rob Kleiner

== Risks ==
Excessive or particularly aggressive playing of col legno can damage the bow. Extended col legno playing can also damage the varnish or finish of the bow, scratch the instrument surface, create 'rosin lines', damage the wood of the bow, or damage string windings. Therefore, many string players choose to play with a less valuable bow.

Some organisations sell bows specifically made for playing col legno, where the stick is made out of stronger, stiffer material, like carbon fibre or fibreglass, instead of the usual wood. Some players tap the strings with pencils instead of bows, producing a further percussive, lighter sound.
