= Tonguing =

Articulatory musical technique using a wind instrument

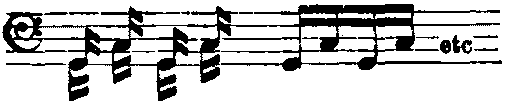
Kettledrum double cross-beat. So-called because kettledrums were associated with trumpets and borrowed the terms for their rhythms from those for tonguing.

Tonguing is a technique used with wind instruments to enunciate notes using the tongue on the palate or the reed or mouthpiece. A silent "tee" is made when the tongue strikes the reed or roof of the mouth causing a slight breach in the air flow through the instrument. If a more soft tone is desired, the syllable "da" (as in double) is preferred. The technique also works for whistling. Tonguing also refers to articulation, which is how a musician begins the note (punchy, legato, or a breath attack) and how the note is released (air release, tongued release, etc.) For wind players, articulation is commonly spoken of in terms of tonguing because the tongue is used to stop and allow air to flow in the mouth. Tonguing does not apply to non wind instruments, but articulation does apply to all instruments.

An alteration called "double-tonguing" or "double-articulation" is used when the music being performed has many rapid notes in succession too fast for regular articulation. In this case, the tongue makes a silent "tee-kee". (The actual tongue positioning varies slightly by instrument. Clarinetists may go "too-koo" but a bassoonist may actually say "taco".) Double-articulation allows the tongue to stop the airflow twice as fast when mastered. If the music specifies a pizzicato sequence, the musician might perform this as a rapid sequence of the articulated note, thus: "tee-kee-tee-kee-tee-kee-..." etc., in staccato. When beginning with "da", the second syllable is "ga". Double tonguing is easiest on brass instruments, and it is more difficult for some woodwind instruments, primarily the clarinet and saxophone.

There is also "triple-tonguing", used in passages of triplets: "tee-tee-kee-tee-tee-kee", or less commonly "tee-kee-tee-tee-kee-tee". Cross-beat tonguing, used for dotted rhythms (Notes inégales: louré or pointé): tu-ru, with ru falling on the longer note on the beat. Another method was made by Earl D. Irons, this method was a tee-kee-tee kee-tee-kee. This triple tonguing method is most likely the fastest if done correctly. The reason for this is that the tee and kee never repeat itself. Earl D. Irons is the author of 27 Groups Of Exercises, a book full of lip-slurs, double tonguing, and triple tonguing. Such as:

- (=.)
tu-ru

There are different ways of tonguing for the flute. Some flutists tongue between the teeth; others do it between the lips as if spitting; others do it behind the teeth in the roof of the mouth as with trill consonants. With this roof articulation the flutist thinks of the words dah-dah and for double tonguing it is dah-gah-dah-gah.

Tonguing is indicated in the score by the use of accent marks. The absence of slurs is usually understood to imply that each note should be tongued separately. When a group of notes is slurred together, the player is expected to tongue the first note of the group and not tongue any of the other notes, unless those notes have accent marks.

Trombone players must lightly tongue many slurs by tonguing "da"; otherwise, the result would be a glissando. The bagpipes require finger articulations ("graces"), since direct tonguing is impossible.

== See also ==
- Articulation (music)
- Flutter-tonguing
