= Accent (music) =

Emphasis on a note

The horizontal wedges on four of the sixteenth notes are accents. They instruct the musician to play those notes more forcefully.

In music, an accent is an emphasis, stress, or stronger attack placed on a particular note or set of notes, or chord, either because of its context or specifically indicated by an accent mark. Accents contribute to the articulation and prosody of a performance of a musical phrase. Accents may be written into a score or part by a composer, or added by the performer as part of their interpretation of a musical piece.

Compared to surrounding notes:

- A dynamic accent or stress accent is an emphasis using louder sound or stronger sound; typically, most pronounced on the attack of the sound.
- A tonic accent is an emphasis on notes by virtue of them being higher in pitch, as opposed to higher in volume.
- An agogic accent is an emphasis by virtue of notes being longer in duration.

Accents that do not correspond to the stressed beats of the prevailing meter are said to be syncopated. For example, in common time, also called 4/4, the most common metre in popular music, the stressed beats are one and three. If accented chords or notes are played on beats two or four, that creates syncopation, since the music is emphasizing the "weak" beats of the bar. Syncopation is used in classical music, popular music, and traditional music. However, it is more prominent in blues, jazz, funk, disco, and Latin music.

== Agogic ==
There are four kinds of agogic accents:

- Longer notated duration of a note, for example, a whole note/semibreve (four beats in common time) among quarter notes/crotchets (each of which gets one beat).
- Extended duration of a note within its full-time value (without altering the tempo). For example, players of organ and harpsichord (which do not allow the use of dynamic accents) can emphasize one of a sequence of staccato quarter notes by making it less staccato (that is, making one note longer to emphasize it).
- Extended duration of a note with the effect of temporarily slowing down the tempo (rubato or rallentando).
- Delayed onset of a note, for example by doing a pause before starting a note.

== Marks ==
In music notation, an accent mark indicates a louder dynamic and a stronger attack to apply to a single note or an articulation mark.

From left to right, the meanings of these articulation marks are explained below:

- The most common symbol is the horizontal wedge, the first symbol in the diagram above. This is the symbol that is most commonly referred to as "accent mark." It indicates that the marked note should have an emphasized beginning and then taper off rather quickly. Though it is usually simply referred to as an accent. In jazz articulation, it is stated as "dah."
- The vertical wedge, hat, or petit chapeau, shown second, signifies that a note should be played marcato (Italian for "marked"). It is generally accepted to be as loud as an accent mark and as short as a staccato. Martellato, Italian for "hammered," also is denoted with the symbol, referring to a specific bowing technique used to create marcato. In jazz articulation, marcato is typically stated as "daht," yet the performing musician may interpret the duration of the note differently depending on what style of jazz they are playing.
- The dot, shown third, signifies that a note should be played staccato. It indicates that the last part of a note should be silenced to create separation between it and the following note. For example, a written quarter note should be played as an eighth note followed by an eighth rest. The duration of a staccato note may be about half as long as the note value would indicate, although the tempo and performers' taste varies this quite a bit. In jazz articulation, it is stated as "dit."
- The vertical stroke, (or sometimes an inverted wedge or inverted teardrop), shown fourth, is usually interpreted as staccatissimo, shorter than staccato. A staccatissimo crotchet (quarter note) would be correctly played in traditional art music as a lightly articulated semi-quaver (sixteenth note) followed by rests which fill the remainder of the beat. This mark was used by multiple composers, including Wolfgang Amadeus Mozart, Anton Bruckner, and Joseph Haydn, and the composers' intentions often varied at different points in their careers, and even at different points within a single work. The marking was generally used to indicate that the articulation was different. The marking was used to indicate various degrees of emphasis (ranging from accent to marcato), brevity (ranging from detached to staccato to hooked bowing), or some combination of the two. In the second half of the 19th century, German music (starting with Haydn's later works) began replacing the vertical stroke with the regular accent mark when the notes were to be emphasized but not abbreviated, and French music began replacing the vertical stroke with the staccato dot when the notes were to be both emphasized and abbreviated. In 1954, a competition was held to write an essay on whether engravers should differentiate between vertical strokes and dots found in Mozart's scores. Four of five of the essays published indicated a clear distinction in at least some passages. The same can be said of Bruckner's use of these symbols. Because of the problems associated with reading music with this accent mark, the once commonplace marking has fallen nearly into disuse today.
- Finally, the tenuto mark, shown fifth above, generally means that a note or chord is to be played at full length. In jazz articulation, it is stated as "doo."

Even when these symbols are absent, experienced musicians will introduce the appropriate gesture according to the style of the music. Mark McGrain writes about articulation on page 156 in his book Music Notation: Theory and Technique for Music Notation, where marcato accent in the third mark shown is referred to as the forzato accent, and the symbol as just an accent is referring to as the sforzando accent. "Neither of these accents alter the durational value of the note or voicing they attend."

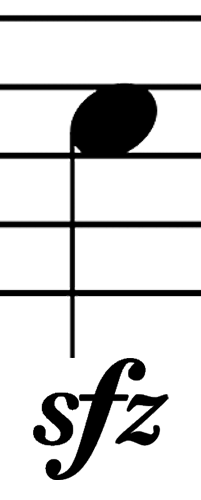
Sforzando notation on a quarter note beat

Another way to indicate accented notes (notes to emphasize or play louder compared to surrounding notes) is with sforzando, sforzato, forzando or forzato (abbreviated sfz, sf, or fz) ("forcing" or "forced").

== See also ==
- List of ornaments
- Sforzando

== Bibliography ==
- Rimas, Juozas, Rimas Jr., Juozas. (2024). Agogics and Tempo Rubato. In: Etudes on the Philosophy of Music. Cham, Switzerland: Palgrave Macmillan. ISBN 978-3-031-63965-4 Open Access:
