= Portato =

Form of musical articulation

Portato ([porˈtaːto]; Italian past participle of portare, "to carry"), also mezzo-staccato, French notes portées, in music denotes a smooth, pulsing articulation and is often notated by staccato dots added under slur markings.

Portato is also known as articulated legato.

== Description ==
One type of portato notation, also used for staccato and flying spiccato.

Portato is a bowing technique for bowed stringed instruments in which successive notes are gently re-articulated while being joined under a single continuing bow stroke. It achieves a kind of pulsation or undulation, rather than separating the notes. It has been notated in various ways. One early 19th-century writer, Pierre Baillot (L'art du violon, Paris, 1834), gives two alternatives: a wavy line, and dots under a slur. Later in the century a third method became common: placing "legato" dashes (tenuto) under a slur. The notation with dots under slurs is ambiguous, because it is also used for very different bowings, including staccato and flying spiccato. Currently, portato is sometimes indicated in words, by "mezzo-staccato" or "non-legato"; or can be shown by three graphic forms:

- a slur that encompasses a phrase of staccato notes (the most common), or
- a tenuto above a staccato mark (very often), or
- a slur that encompasses a phrase of tenuto notes (less common).

Portato is defined by some authorities as "the same as portamento".

== See also ==
- Legato
- Bariolage
