= Tempo rubato =

Musical term

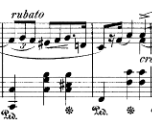
F. Chopin, Mazurka Op. 6 No. 1 bar 9-10, Oeuvres complètes de Frédéric Chopin, Band 1, Bote & Bock, 1880 image from imslp.

Tempo rubato (Italian for 'stolen time'; UK: /ˈtɛmpoʊ rʊˈbɑːtoʊ/, US: /ruː-/, Italian: [ˈtɛmpo ruˈbaːto];) is a musical term referring to expressive and rhythmic freedom by a slight speeding up and then slowing down of the tempo of a piece at the discretion of the soloist or the conductor. Rubato is an expressive shaping of music that is a part of phrasing.

While rubato is often loosely taken to mean playing with expressive and rhythmic freedom, it was traditionally used specifically in the context of expression as speeding up and then slowing down the tempo. In the past, expressive and free playing (beyond only rubato) was often associated with the terms "ad libitum". Rubato, even when not notated, is often used liberally by musicians, e.g. singers frequently use it intuitively to let the tempo of the melody expressively shift slightly and freely above that of the accompaniment. This intuitive shifting leads to rubato's main effect: making music sound expressive and natural. Nineteenth century composer-pianist Frédéric Chopin is often mentioned in the context of rubato (see Chopin's technique and performance style and his adaptation of the bel canto idiom).

The term rubato existed even before the romantic era. In the 18th century, rubato meant expressing rhythm spontaneously, with freedom. In many cases, it was achieved by playing uneven notes. This idea was used, among others, by Ernst Wilhelm Wolf and Carl Philipp Emanuel Bach. In addition to that, Leopold Mozart claimed that the accompaniment should remain strictly in tempo.

In the mid 18th century, the meaning of rubato began to change gradually. People were using the term as being able to move notes freely back and forth. Johann Friedrich Agricola interpreted rubato as "stealing the time".

As time moved on to the 19th century, rubato became recognized slightly differently. In Chopin's music, rubato functioned as a way to make a melody more emotional through changing the tempo by, for instance, accelerando, ritenuto and syncopations. Chopin "often played with the melody subtly lingering or passionately anticipating the beat while the accompaniment stayed at least relatively, if not strictly, in time". In this case, rubato is used as a concept of flexibility of tempo for a more expressive melody.

== Types ==
One can distinguish two types of rubato: in one the tempo of the melody is flexible, while the accompaniment is kept in typical regular pulse (yet not rigidly in mechanical fashion; but adjusting to the melody as necessary—see below). Another type affects melody and accompaniment. While it is often associated with music of the Romantic period, classical performers frequently use rubato for emotional expressiveness in all kinds of works.

Tempo rubato (or a tempo rubato) means literally in robbed time, i.e., duration taken from one measure or beat and given to another, but in modern practice the term is quite generally applied to any irregularity of rhythm or tempo not definitely indicated in the score.
The terms ad libitum, (ad lib.), a piacere, and a capriccio, also indicate a modification of the tempo at the will of the performer. Ad libitum means at liberty; a piacere, at pleasure; and a capriccio, at the caprice (of the performer).

— Music notation and terminology (1921) by Karl Wilson Gehrkens

A tempo rubato. Lit. "in robbed time", i. e. time in which, while every bar is of its proper time value, one portion of it may be played faster or slower at the expense of the remaining portion, so that, if the first half be somewhat slackened, the second half is somewhat quickened, and vice versa. With indifferent performers, this indication is too often confounded with some expression signifying ad libitum.

— A dictionary of foreign musical terms and handbook of orchestral instruments (1907) by Tom S. Wotton

It is apparent from the above that the expression is evocative rather than precise noting Wotton asserts that "every bar has its proper time value" whereas Gehrkens describes "duration taken from one measure [...] and given to another" which allows bars of differing duration. Rubato relates to phrasing; and since phrases often go over multiple bars; it is often impossible (and also not desired) for each bar to be identically long.

=== Early twentieth century ===
Early twentieth-century rubato seems to be very eventful. Robert Philip in his book Early recordings and musical style: Changing tastes in instrumental performance, 1900–1950 specifies three types of rubato used at that time: accelerando and rallentando, tenuto and agogic accents, and melodic rubato.

==== Accelerando and rallentando ====
Late 19th century dictionaries of musical terms defined tempo rubato as "robbed or stolen time." This effect can be achieved by a slight quickening of speed in ascending passages, for instance, and calando on descending phrases. Ignacy Jan Paderewski says that tempo rubato relies on "more or less important slackening or quickening of the time or rate of the movement." Many theoreticians and performers claimed at that time that the "robbed" time must be eventually "paid back" later within the same measure, so that the change of tempo would not affect the length of the measure. However, the balance theory caused controversy, as many theoreticians dismissed the assumption that the "stolen" time should necessarily be "paid back." In the third edition of Grove's Dictionary we read: "The rule has been given and repeated indiscriminately that the "robbed" time must be "paid back" within the bar. That is absurd, because the bar line is a notational, not a musical, matter. But there is no necessity to pay back even within the phrase: it is the metaphor that is wrong."

Paderewski also discarded this theory saying: "(...) the value of notes diminished in one period through an accelerando, cannot always be restored in another through a ritardando. What is lost is lost."

Some theoreticians, however, rejected even the idea that rubato relies on accelerando and ritardando. They were not recommending that a performance should be strictly metronomic, but they came up with a theory saying that rubato should consist of tenuto and shortened notes.

==== Tenuto and agogic accents ====
The first writer who extended the theory of "agogics" was Hugo Riemann in his book Musikalische Dynamik und Agogik (1884). The theory was based on the idea of using small changes of rhythm and tempo for expression. Riemann used the term "agogic accent", by which he meant accentuation achieved by lengthening of a note.

The theory found many supporters. J. Alfred Johnstone called the idea of agogic accents "quasi tempo rubato." He also expressed his appreciation for this theory, saying that "modern editors are coming to recognize it as one of the important principles of expressive interpretation." In his illustration of agogic accents in Mendelssohn's Andante and Rondo Capriccioso op. 14, Johnstone explains, that even though the rhythm consists of equal quarter notes, they should not be played the same length; the highest note of the phrase ought to be the longest while other notes shortened proportionally. One of the musicians known for using agogic accents in their playing was the violinist Joseph Joachim.

Some writers compared this type of rubato to declamation in speech. This idea was widely developed by singers. According to Gordon Heller: "If groups of notes happen to occur, which have to be sung to one word, the student must be careful to make the first note very slightly longer – though only very slightly – than the rest of the group. Should a triplet be written by the composer, care must be taken here to make the first note of the three a trifle longer than the rest, and thus give a musicianly rendering of it. To hurry the time in such a pace would spoil the rhythm..."

==== Melodic rubato ====
Both of the theories described above had their opponents and supporters. There was one question, though, that emerged in reference to both. Regardless if a melody is released from strict note values by accelerando and ritardando or agogic accents, should the accompaniment follow the melody or remain strict in time? The latter means that the melody would be either behind or ahead of the accompaniment for a moment. Eventually, in spite of doubts of some, it has become a tradition that the accompaniment did not follow the flexibility of the melody. As Franklin Taylor writes: "It should be observed that any independent accompaniment to a rubato phrase must always keep strict time, and it is, therefore, quite possible that no note of a rubato melody will fall exactly with its corresponding note in the accompaniment, except, perhaps, the first note in the bar."

Robert Philip's further research shows that these three components (accelerando and rallentando, tenuto and agogic accents, and melodic rubato) were most often used together, as each performer could combine all of them and give the melody flexibility in their own specific way.

== Chopin ==
Frederic Chopin (1810–1849) wrote the term rubato in fourteen different works. All of the spots marked rubato in his fourteen compositions have a flowing melody in the right hand and several accompanying notes in the left hand. Thus, Chopin's rubato can be approached with delaying or anticipating those melody notes. According to descriptions of Chopin's playing, he played with the melody slightly delaying or excitedly anticipating the beat while the left-hand accompaniment went on playing in time.

Usually, his usage of the term rubato in a score suggested a brief effect. However, when the term sempre rubato was marked, it indicated a rubato that continued for about two measures. Interestingly, Chopin never marked a tempo following rubato. This leaves the length of the "momentary effect" up to the interpretation of the performer. Therefore, the performer must understand the purpose of why rubato is indicated from the composer.

There are three purposes why Chopin marks the word rubato in his compositions: to articulate a repetition, to emphasize an expressive high point or appoggiatura and to set a particular mood at the beginning of a piece.

The first main purpose for which Chopin marks rubato is to articulate the repetition of a unit of music. For example, the rubato marked in bar 9 in Mazurka Op. 6 No. 1 points out the beginning of the repetition after the first eight-measure unit. Another example of this usage of rubato occurs in the Mazurka Op. 7 No. 3. In this piece, the theme begins at measure 8 and repeats at measure 16, which is where the rubato is marked. From this, the performer is given the cue to approach the repeated material differently the second time it occurs.

Chopin's second main purpose for using rubato is to create an intensely expressive moment such as at the high point of a melodic line or at an appoggiatura. For example, in the Nocturne Op. 9 No. 2, bar 26 has an intensely singing moment where the melody leaps up to an E♭. However, this E♭ is not the highest point of the phrase. Therefore, Chopin marked poco rubato to signify to the player that they can emphasize the intensely expressive moment, but to also hold back for the actual climax occurring one measure later. A second example of rubato used at a singing moment is in his Second Piano Concerto. In a similar situation, the melody leaps up to three A♭ played consecutively and the rubato marked tells the player to perform them in a singing quality.

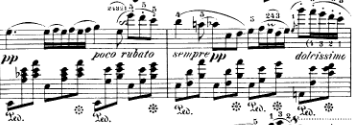
F. Chopin, Nocturne Op. 9 No. 2, Sämtliche Pianoforte-Werke, Band I, C.F.Peters, 1905, image form imslp.

Chopin primarily marks rubato to emphasize expressive melodic lines or repetition. However, in some cases, he also uses rubato to establish a certain mood at the beginning of a piece. The Nocturne Op. 15 No. 3 is one of the examples of rubato being used for setting up a mood. In the Nocturne Op. 15 No. 3, Chopin marked Languido e rubato in the first bar, as a general suggestion of the work's comprehensive way of delivery. The rubato in a languid manner would affect the tempo, tone color, touch, and dynamics, which influence performers to set the mood at the beginning of the piece.

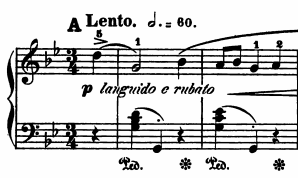
F.Chopin, Nocturne Op. 15 No. 3, Klavierwerke. Instructive Ausgabe, Vol.V: Nocturnes, Schlesinger'sche Buch-und Musikhandlung, 1881, image from imslp

== Quotations ==
There is no absolute rhythm. In the course of the dramatic developments of a musical composition, the initial themes change their character, consequently rhythm changes also, and, in conformity with that character, it has to be energetic or languishing, crisp or elastic, steady or capricious.

[...] Rubato must emerge spontaneously from the music, it can't be calculated but must be totally free. It's not even something you can teach: each performer must feel it on the basis of his or her own sensitivity. There's no magic formula: to assume otherwise would be ridiculous.

Performers also frequently show a tendency to speed up and slow down when this is not indicated in the score. Such modifications of tempo typically occur in relation to phrase structure, as a way of marking phrase boundaries.

Tempo Rubato is a potent factor in musical oratory, and every interpreter should be able to use it skillfully and judiciously, as it emphasizes the expression, introduces variety, infuses life into mechanical execution. It softens the sharpness of lines, blunts the structural angles without ruining them, because its action is not destructive: it intensifies, subtilizes, idealizes the rhythm. As stated above, it converts energy into languor, crispness into elasticity, steadiness into capriciousness. It gives music, already possessed of the metric and rhythmic accents, a third accent, emotional, individual, that which Mathis Lussy, in his excellent book on musical expression, calls l'accent pathètique.

Variations of Tempo, the ritardando, accelerando, and tempo rubato, are all legitimate aids demanded by Expression. [...] use is determined by sound judgment and correct musicianly taste.

Because the purpose of rubato is to add a sense of improvisatory freedom to the performance, one should avoid using the same kind of rubato repeatedly in a piece. Stretching or rushing successive phrases in the same way creates a monotonous sense of predictability that defeats the purpose.

In keeping tempo Chopin was inflexible, and it will surprise many to learn that the metronome never left his piano. Even in his much-slandered rubato, one hand, the accompanying hand, always played in strict tempo, while the other - singing, either indecisively hesitating or entering ahead of the beat and moving more quickly with a certain impatient vehemence, as in passionate speech - freed the truth of the musical expression from all rhythmic bonds.

== Misinterpretations ==
Definitions of musical concepts (such as rubato) cause misinterpretations if they disregard artistic musical expression. The type of rubato in which the accompaniment is kept regular does not require absolute regularity; the accompaniment still gives full regard to the melody (often the singer or soloist) and yields tempo where necessary:

It is amusing to note that even some serious persons express the idea that in tempo rubato "the right hand may use a certain freedom while the left hand must keep strict time." (See Frederick Niecks' Life of Chopin, II, p. 101.) A nice sort of music would result from such playing. Something like the singing of a good vocalist accompanied by a poor blockhead who hammers away in strict time without yielding to the singer who, in sheer despair, must renounce all artistic expression.

In the music of Chopin, the word "rubato" appears in just 14 of his works. While other composers (such as Schumann and Mahler) are ignored in regards to this issue, we often fail to consider the German terms, like "Zeit lassen", for the same principle. The fact that "rubato" is more an aspect of performance than a compositional device makes us question whether some other terms that could be interpreted as tempo distortions, like "cédez", "espressivo", "calando", "incalzando", or even Brahms' special "dolce" and "sostenuto", are clear-cut in performance.

[...] nothing in general can be more disagreeable than this species of brilliant accompaniment, where the voice is only considered as an accessory and where the accompanier, without regarding the taste, feeling, compass, or style of the singer, the pathos of the air, or sense of the words, either mechanically runs through the prescribed solemnity of the adagio, with the one two three precision of the metronome, or rattles away without mercy through the allegro whenever an occasion presents itself for the luxuriant ad libitum introduction of turns, variations, and embellishments.

— Almack's revisited: or, Herbert Milton (1828) by Charles White)

[...] a Metronome is apt to kill the finer Time-sense implied by Rubato.

== Examples ==
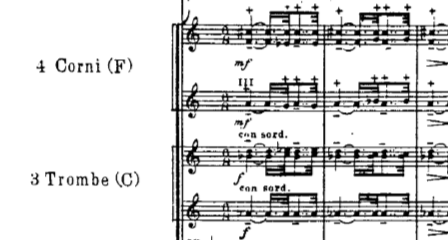
introduction of II mov. of Rachmaninoff's Symphonic Dances

Sergei Rachmaninoff is one of the composers who uses the proper term "tempo rubato" in some passages of his orchestral works, such as the buzzy introduction for the 2nd movement of his Symphonic Dances.

Another example is the 2nd theme of the first movement of his Symphony No. 3.

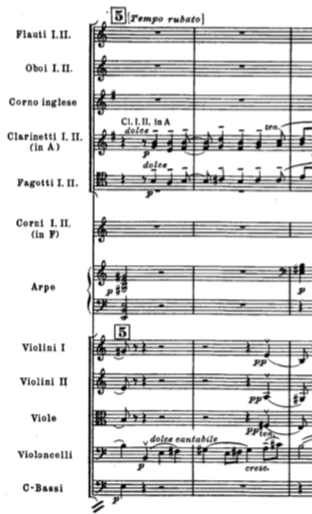
Second theme of I mov. of Rachmaninoff's Symphony n.3

Rachmaninoff's rubato re-created the eloquence and sure musical instinct that must have characterised the rubato practice of Mozart, Beethoven or Chopin.
