= Prosody (music) =

Concept in musical composition

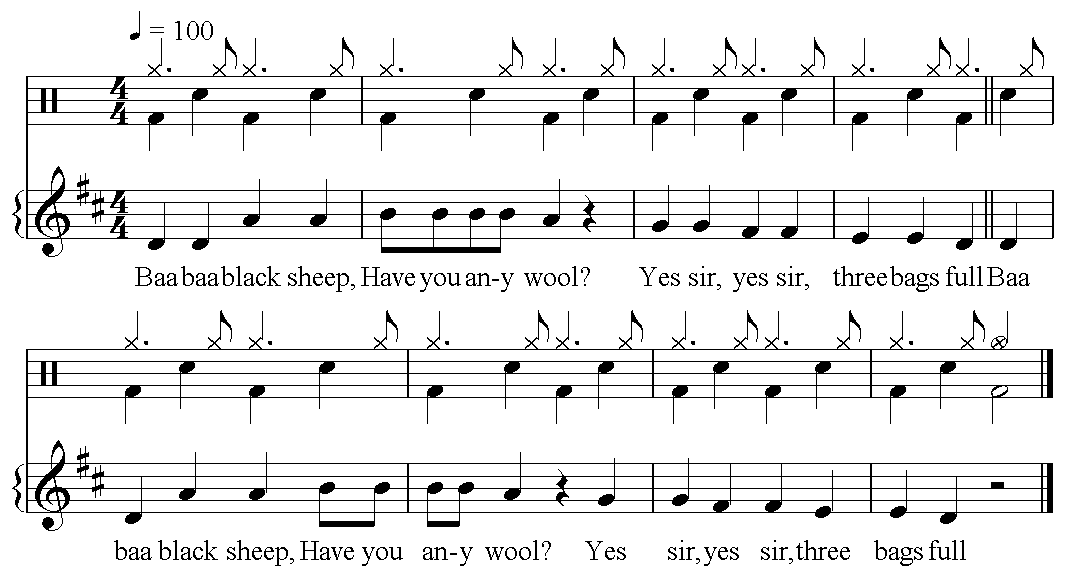
Simple example of variation in prosody: what if the phrase started on 4 instead of 1 (upbeat vs. downbeat/on-beat vs. off-beat)? Play

In music, prosody is the way the composer sets the text of a vocal composition in the assignment of syllables to notes in the melody to which the text is sung, or to set the music with regard to the ambiance of the lyrics.

However, the relationship between syllables and melodic notes is just one dimension of musical prosody. According to Pat Pattison, prosody is "The appropriate relationship between elements, whatever they may be." In this sense, every element in a song can and should create prosody, because prosody is "support for what is being said." In this sense, even the number of lines in a verse or a verse's rhyme scheme can be used to create or enhance prosody.

For example, a songwriter might align downbeats or accents with stressed syllables or important words, or create musical accompaniment to the meter of the lyrics. Also, prosody can mean how the music supports the connotation, or emotive nature, of a song.

Any musical work with a singer, regardless of the genre, requires its composer or songwriter to examine the interplay between the music and the words. For example, the mood of the music typically matches that of the lyrical content: for example, when the lyrics address a sad topic, the music would sound sad, perhaps using minor chords.

Of course, composers might work differently, setting a textual mood against a contrasting musical mood. However, the term "prosody" tends to refer not to the matching of music with content, but with the matching of a melody with the language itself, so that the words being sung come across as naturally as possible. According to Mark Altrogge: "Generally when writing songs and poetry, we want to accent a phrase like we'd speak it." Melodies that do not come relatively close to approximating speech make the words hard to understand; melodies that go beyond the point of clarity and come even closer to approximating speech make the singer sound more human and therefore have a stronger emotional impact on the listener.

A melody with good prosody will not assign long notes to relatively insignificant syllables, nor will it put them on the beat or give them any sort of accentuation. The musical phrases will match the grammatical phrases, so that musical pauses happen in places that would be natural for a speaker.

The term prosody, from the Greek prosōidía ("song sung to music"), traditionally describes the alignment of a word's natural linguistic accent with non-textual elements of a musical setting, such as rhythmic and metrical accent and melodic direction. In this narrow sense, a setting exhibits good prosody when stressed syllables of a lyric fall on stressed beats or prominent melodic notes, so that the sung text approximates natural speech. Contemporary songwriting pedagogy has expanded the term to describe the alignment of lyrics with any musical element that contributes to the song's meaning or emotional effect.

== Constructional elements ==
Building on the expanded definition of prosody as the alignment of any musical element with lyric meaning, Shane Adams has catalogued specific constructional elements a songwriter can deliberately align with a lyric's story and emotion. These include tempo, harmonic rhythm, chord quality, key, arrangement, lyric density, melodic note values, melodic contour, and rhythmic feel. Adams frames these collectively as "how you say the words," drawing an analogy to the way vocal tone and inflection alter the meaning of a spoken phrase such as "it's time to leave," which can be delivered as a command, a question, a sigh of regret, or a sarcastic aside depending on non-textual cues.

Adams identifies several dimensions along which prosody can operate in popular song. Melodic contour can mirror a lyric image, as in "Over the Rainbow" (Harburg and Arlen), in which the opening leap and subsequent descent trace an arc that visually echoes a rainbow. Pitch selection can reinforce a single word, as in "Friends in Low Places" (Lee and Blackwell), where the word "low" falls on the lowest melodic note of the chorus. Structural placement of the title or hook within a chorus can also generate prosody: in Lorde's "Royals," the title is positioned at the front of every chorus line, putting the "royals" ahead of everything else and reinforcing the song's theme of unattainable status; in Neon Trees' "Everybody Talks," the title arrives only on the final line of the chorus, mirroring the lyric's depiction of a rumor building from a whisper to widespread talk; and in George Michael's "Careless Whisper," the hook "never gonna dance again" appears at both the beginning and end of the chorus with an empty middle, evoking the isolation described in the lyric.

== See also ==
- Anacrusis
- Articulation (music)
- Caesura
- Meter (music)
- Rhythm
