= Flutter-tonguing =

Wind instrument tonguing technique

Flutter-tonguing is a wind instrument tonguing technique. In this technique, performers flutter their tongue to make a characteristic "FrrrrrFrrrrr" sound. The effect varies according to the instrument and at what volume it is played, ranging from cooing sounds on a recorder to an effect similar to the growls used by jazz musicians.

Bassoon flutter-tonguing
A bassoon being flutter-tongued.

Trombone flutter-tonguing
A flutter-tonguing trombone.

== Notation ==
Tremolo notation

In sheet music, the technique is usually indicated with the standard tremolo markings on a note alongside a text instruction to flutter the note. The German marking "Flatterzunge" is often abbreviated to "Flz." or "Flt.". The Italian "frullato" is sometimes abbreviated to "frull". In English, the most common indication is "f.t." Other markings that composers have used to indicate flutter tonguing include: coupe de lange roulé, en roulant la langue, tremolo dental, tremolo avec la langue, tremolo roulé, vibrata linguale, vibrando, and colpo di lingua among others. However, simply writing (3-line) tremolo marks on all rhythmic values without other indication is most generally accepted.

== Usage ==
One of the earliest uses of flutter-tonguing was by Pyotr Ilyich Tchaikovsky in his ballet The Nutcracker. In the opening of the final act, Tchaikovsky makes the flutes flutter-tongue to depict the cascading river of rose-oil seen as Clara and the Nutcracker are welcomed to the kingdom of Confiturembourg: he named the effect frullato, as did the flautist who first introduced him to the technique, Alexander Khimichenko.

The effect has since been called for in many classical compositions, where it is most often used on flutes, recorders, clarinets, saxophones, bassoons, trumpets, and trombones, but can be used on other brass and woodwind instruments as well. The technique became quite common in the 20th century, notably occurring in the music of Schoenberg and Shostakovich, where it can have a nightmarish or sarcastic effect, or conversely by Benjamin Britten who uses the effect on the recorder in Noye's Fludde to imitate the cooing of a dove, or in Curlew River on solo flute to suggest both the mental state of the Madwoman and also the curlews she identifies with.

Both Gustav Mahler and Richard Strauss used the effect as well. In Don Quixote, Strauss imitates the distant bleating of sheep with flutter-tongued notes in the horns. Notably, he uses the marking "Zungenschlag" (tongue-beat) in this passage from Variation II. Elsewhere in the score, he used the traditional German "Flatterzunge". Mahler used this traditional marking as well, but he also deviated from it in the finale of his Second Symphony, where he uses the marking "Zungenstoss" (tongue-thrusts). On sustained whole notes, the tongue thrusts Mahler requires have the effect of a flutter tongue.

Flutter-tonguing is also common in jazz music, particularly that which is associated with New Orleans or Vaudeville style. Cootie Williams was a master of combining a plunger mute with the flutter tongue to create a conversational effect.

== Method ==
The traditional method for producing a flutter tongue effect is to roll the tip of the tongue as rapidly as possible. This is done by performing an isolated alveolar trill while playing the notes desired. Some players find it difficult or even impossible to roll their tongues in this way, possibly due to ankyloglossia.

Uvular fluttertonguing is a method of producing a flutter tongue effect with the back of the tongue. The instrumentalist performs a uvular trill, which produces an only slightly rougher frrrr effect. The uvular trill does NOT produce the traditional growl sound from the jazz idiom. Real growling is produced by singing or groaning while playing a tone. The uvular trill is sometimes used simultaneously with groaning for an even more aggressive sound.

Uvular fluttertonguing can also be used when an alveolar trill is not appropriate to achieve the effect of fluttertonguing, e.g. in the low range of the flute, or when a faster fluttertongue is desired. Fluttertonguing can also be used in conjunction with other types of articulation.

Either method requires more than the usual volume of air to produce the effect.
