= Musical phrasing =

Expressive shaping of note sequences

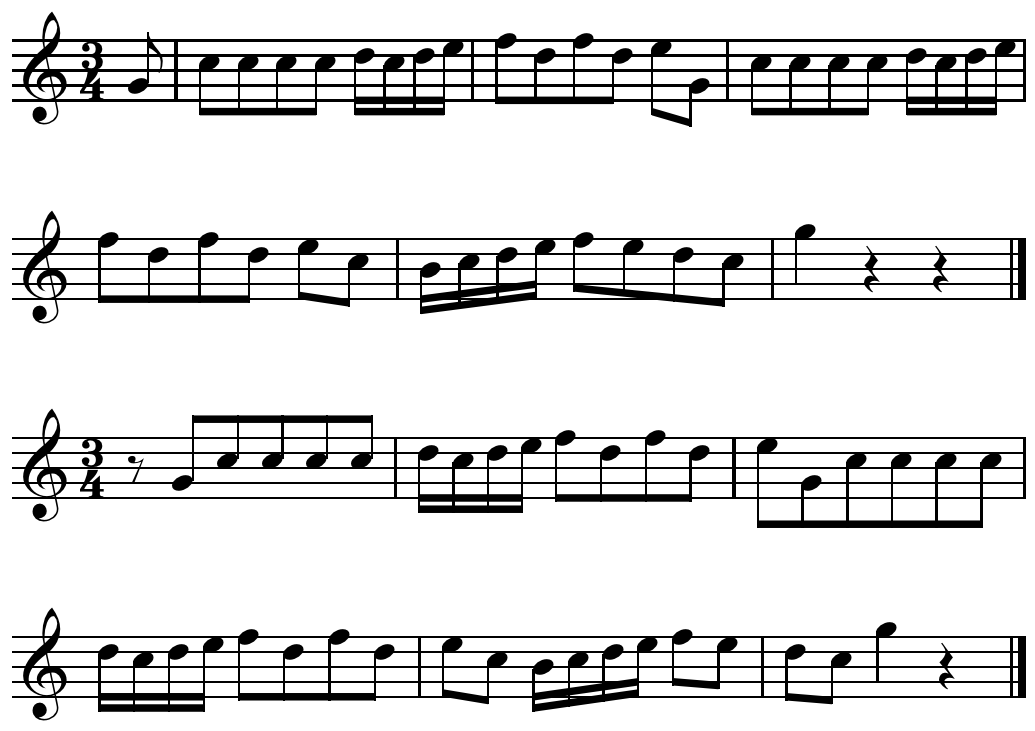
Bar-line shift's effect on metric accent: first two lines vs. second two lines or.

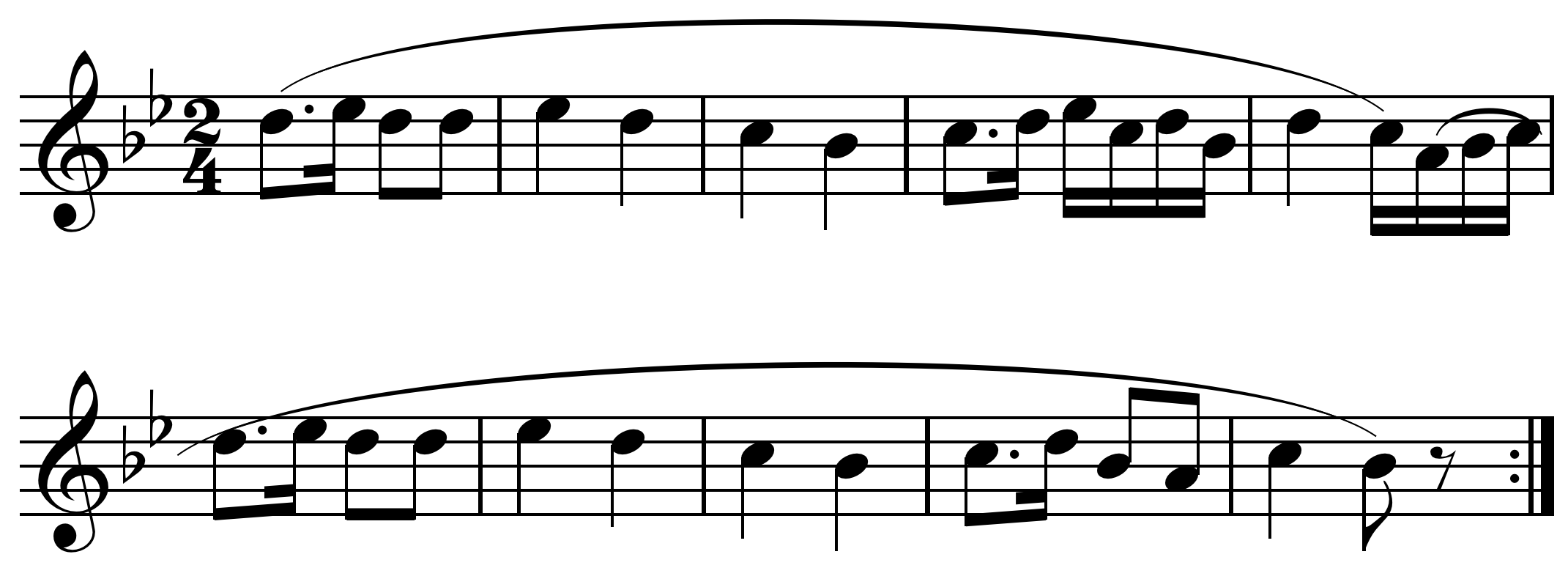
Period (two five-bar phrases) in Haydn's Feldpartita. The second phrase is distinguished by an authentic cadence answering the half cadence at the end of the first phrase. Note the use of slurs by the composer to indicate the intended phrasing.

Musical phrasing is the method by which a musician shapes a sequence of notes in a passage of music to allow expression, much like when speaking English a phrase may be written identically but may be spoken differently, and is named for the interpretation of small units of time known as phrases —often defined as half of a period. A musician accomplishes this by interpreting the music—from memory or sheet music—by altering tone, tempo, dynamics, articulation, inflection, and other characteristics. Phrasing can emphasise a concept in the music or a message in the lyrics, or it can digress from the composer's intention, aspects of which are commonly indicated in musical notation called phrase marks or phrase markings. For example, accelerating the tempo or prolonging a note may add tension.

A phrase is a substantial musical thought, which ends with a musical punctuation called a cadence. Phrases are created in music through an interaction of melody, harmony, and rhythm.

Giuseppe Cambini—a composer, violinist, and music teacher of the Classical period—had this to say about bowed string instruments, specifically violin, phrasing:

The bow can express the affections of the soul: but besides there being no signs that indicate them, such signs, even were one to invent them, would become so numerous that the music, already too full of indications, would become a formless mass to the eyes, almost impossible to decipher. I should consider myself fortunate if I could only get a student to hear, through a small number of examples, the difference between bad and mediocre, mediocre and good, and good and excellent, in the diversity of expressions that one may give to the same passage.

— "Nouvelle Méthode théorique et pratique pour le violon". Paris, Naderman (c. 1803)

== Intuitive and analytical phrasing ==
"There are two schools of thought on phrasing," says flutist Nancy Toff: "one more intuitive, the other more analytical. The intuitive school uses a verbal model, equating the function of phrasing with that of punctuation in language. Thus, said Chopin to a student, 'He who phrases incorrectly is like a man who does not understand the language he speaks.'"

Problems linked with an analytical approach to phrasing occur particularly when the analytical approach is based only on the search for objective information, or (as is often the case) only concerned with the score:

The reliance on the score for information about temporal structures reflects a more profound analytical difficulty. Structural information gleaned from the score is visually apprehended and as such is predisposed to visualist models of structure. These models are premised on symmetry and balance and on a timeless notion of "objective" structure. [...] Temporal and aurally-apprehended structures are denied reality because they cannot be said to "exist" in the way that spatial and visually apprehended structures do. [...] Musical investigations exhibit the Western prejudice toward visualism in the dependence on visual symmetry and balance. Information about structure from listening experience is suspect because it is considered "subjective" and is opposed to "objective" information from the score.

— F. Joseph Smith

According to Andranik Tangian, analytical phrasing can be quite subjective, the only point is that it should follow a certain logic. For example, Webern’s Klangfarbenmelodie-styled orchestral arrangement of Ricercar from Bach’s Musical offering demonstrates Webern’s analytical phrasing of the theme, which is quite subjective on the one hand but, on the other hand, logically consistent:

The first note of the countersubject (C) is deliberately detached from the theme, as shown by the change from brass to strings. Previous notes are grouped as if they were suspensions with resolutions. It follows that the theme may be considered to end only at the B natural in bar 6, at the F natural in bar 7, or at D natural in bar 8; this in turn implies the theme is interpreted as modulating into the tonality of the dominant, and moreover that in accordance with the rules of polyphony it may end only with the B natural — the mediant — rather than with the 5th or the 7th (D natural or F natural). The notes which follow the B natural may therefore be considered as not attributed to the theme but as a codetta (quite unevident interpretation!). Thus Webern's interpretation implies two contrasting episodes distinguished within the theme: the first phrase (trombone) and the descending chromatic succession. The latter is itself segmental, this being articulated by changes of instrumentation and further subtleties such as the addition of a harp harmonic.

We conclude:

1. Interpretation is based on the understanding of musical form, being close to music analysis. This analysis is creative, subjective and even ambiguous, being close to composition. On the contrary, the unambiguous analysis, which reflexes evident facts only, is trivial and non-creative. Therefore, there are no "true" interpretation of a piece.

2. Interpretation presupposes finding a structure, which organizes notes into a meaningful composition. Different interpretations are associated with different structures. Structuralization is based on segmentation.

3. Interpretations in form of orchestral arrangements (instruments can be conditional) provide both the structure and indicate the way of execution. lt displays the interpretation of music in a more comprehensive way than precise performance instructions. At the same time it is better adapted for reading and editing. A trained piano player can 'implement' these interpretations in playing by appropriate means of execution.

— Andranik Tangian (1999) "Towards a generative theory of interpretation for performance modeling", Musicae Scientiae, 3(2), pp. 242-243

Departing from Webern’s example, Tangian proposes not only phrasing/interpretation notation but also a model of performance, where the segments are selected both intuitively and analytically and are shown by tempo envelopes, dynamics and specific instrumental techniques.

== Elision or reinterpretation ==
In the analysis of 18th- and 19th-century Western music, an elision, overlap, or reinterpretation (Umdeutung) is the perception, after the fact, of a (metrically weak) cadential chord at the end of one phrase as the (metrically strong) initial chord of the next phrase. Two phrases may overlap, making the beginning and ending of both happen at the same moment in time, or both phrases and hypermeasures may overlap, making the last bar in the first hypermeasure and the first in the second. Charles Burkhart uses overlap and reinterpretation to distinguish between the overlap of phrases and of both phrase and measure-group, respectively.

== See also ==
- Musical technique
- Tempo rubato
