= Symphony No. 67 (Haydn) =

Symphony in four movements by Joseph Haydn

Joseph Haydn

Symphony No. 67 in F major, Hoboken I/67, is a symphony by Joseph Haydn. It was composed by 1779. The Haydn scholar H. C. Robbins Landon calls this work "one of the most boldly original symphonies of this period."

== Music ==
The symphony is scored for two oboes, two bassoons, two horns, and strings.

There are four movements:

1. Presto, 6/8
2. Adagio B♭ major, 2/4
3. Menuetto & Trio, 3/4
4. Finale: Allegro di molto, 2/2 – Adagio e cantabile, 3/8 – Allegro di molto, 2/2

This is the only symphony where Haydn opens in fast 6/8 time without a slow introduction.

At the end of the second movement, the entire string section is directed to play col legno dell'arco (with the wood of the bow).

The trio of the minuet is scored for two solo violins each playing con sordino on single strings. The first violin plays the melody on the E string and the second violin tunes its G string down to F and plays a drone on the open string.

The closing Allegro di molto departs from the standard finale form. It features its own internal Adagio e cantabile slow movement. The fast music is first interrupted by a solo string trio (two violins and cello) instructed to play piano e dolce. The rest of the orchestra elaborates on this slow section, including some passages for the string trio's woodwind counterparts (two solo oboes and a bassoon), before the initial Allegro di molto section returns and Haydn brings the symphony to its conclusion.
