= Martelé (bowstroke) =

Percussive bow stroke

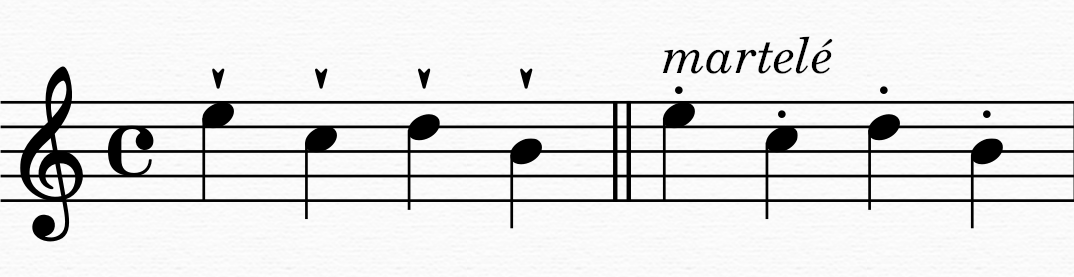
Two ways in which the martelé bowstroke is commonly notated.

An excerpt from Dotzauer's cello étude no. 6, played with martelé bowing

Martelé (French pronunciation: [maʁt(ə)le]; literally meaning "hammered") is a percussive bow stroke used when playing bowed string instruments, though the Italian martellando and martellato are also applied to piano and vocal technique, and even (by Franz Liszt) to the organ. The effect is usually produced by holding the bow against the string with pressure, then releasing it explosively to produce a sharp, biting attack with a rest between strokes.

== History ==
Bows made in the 18th century and earlier, due to their lack of a ferrule, were unable to support the pressure needed to perform the martelé stroke. It wasn't until François Tourte made changes to the bow between 1785 and 1790, including the addition of a ferrule, that the bow was suited for supporting that kind of pressure.

Typically, martelé is notated with triangular wedged accents, but throughout history they have been notated with combinations of staccato markings and accents, as well as implied through indications of sforzando markings.

== Technique ==
Martelé is a form of détaché, which is a term for any bow stroke that is separate from those adjacent to it. To perform the martelé stroke on a string instrument, the player begins by using their index finger to apply pressure to the string. Then the pressure is released, and the wrist moves to perform a short détaché stroke before stopping on the string. A pause is given before proceeding to the next stroke.

Due to the pause and need for preparation between strokes, martelé is unable to be performed on passages of exceptional speed.

== Pedagogy ==
Martelé is a fundamental bowstroke for developing right hand technique for string players. Teaching martelé to young students can be helpful in training the muscles required in playing without tension. Tension is a common issue in young string players and can be easily spotted while playing martelé, which requires engagement in the larger muscles of the upper arm. <https://www.proquest.com/docview/2481240137?sourcetype=Scholarly%20Journals>

== See also ==
- Spiccato
- Pizzicato
- Violin technique
