= Articulation (music) =

Musical parameter affecting sounding of a note

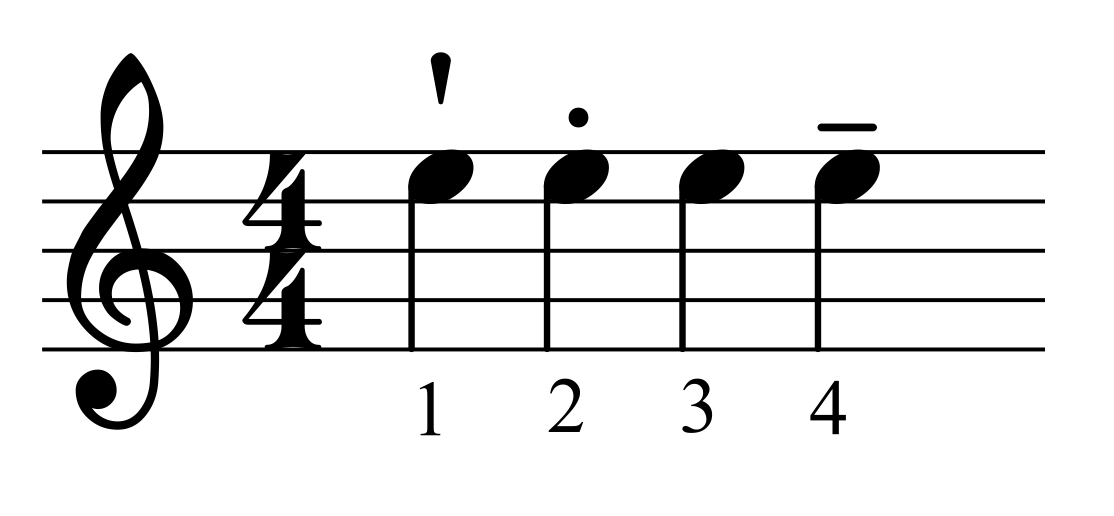
Durational articulations

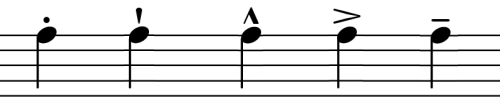
Examples of articulation. From left to right: staccato, staccatissimo or wedge, marcato, accent, tenuto.

Articulations from legato to staccatissimo.

Legato

Portato

Staccato

Staccatissimo

Articulation is a musical parameter that determines how a single note or other discrete event is sounded. Articulations primarily structure an event's start and end, determining the length of its sound and the shape of its attack and decay. They can also modify an event's timbre, dynamics, and pitch. Musical articulation is analogous to the articulation of speech, and during the Baroque and Classical periods it was taught by comparison to oratory.

Western music has a set of traditional articulations that were standardized in the 19th century and remain widely used. Composers are not limited to these, however, and may invent new articulations as a piece requires. When writing electronic and computer music, composers can design articulations from the ground up.

In addition to the following instructions given by composers, performers choose how to articulate the events of a score independently, in accordance with their interpretation of it. Until the 17th century, it was rare to mark articulations in a score, and even during the Baroque period they were uncommon apart from ornaments, leaving them up to the performer and the standards of the time. Even during the Classical period, the interpretation of articulation marks varied far more widely than it does today. Articulations have now become more tightly standardized, but performers still must consider the fashions of their time, methods of playing that were current at the time the piece they are performing was written, the context of their performance, the style of the music, and their own taste and analysis when deciding how to articulate a score's events.

== Articulations ==
There are many types of articulation, each with a different effect on how the note is played. In music notation articulation marks include the slur, phrase mark, staccato, staccatissimo, accent, sforzando, rinforzando, and legato. A different symbol, placed above or below the note (depending on its position on the staff), represents each articulation.

Tenuto	Hold the note in question its full length (or longer, with slight rubato), or play the note slightly louder.
Marcato	Indicates a short note, long chord, or medium passage to be played louder or more forcefully than surrounding music.
Staccato	Signifies a note of shortened duration or detached (not legato)
Legato	Indicates musical notes are to be played or sung smoothly and connected.

The third movement of Beethoven's Symphony No. 6 (Pastoral) exemplifies the effective use of contrast between staccato and legato within the same passage of music:

From Beethoven Symphony No. 6

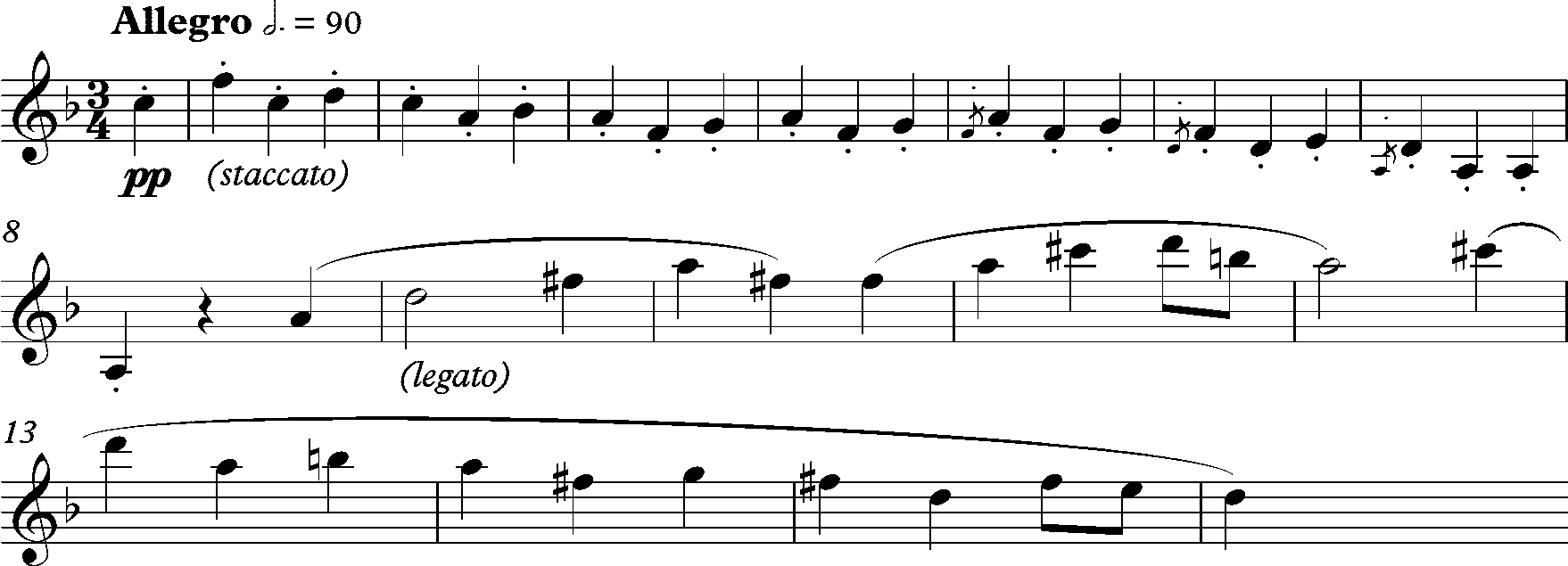
From Beethoven Symphony No. 6

Varying the articulation of a theme can play a role in musical development. For example, Mendelssohn's Hebrides Overture opens with a phrase played legato:

Hebrides Overture opening theme

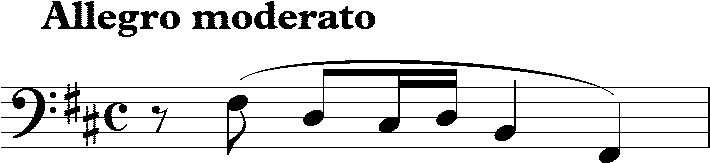
Hebrides Overture opening theme

This idea later re-emerges played staccato as Mendelssohn develops it across the orchestral texture:

Thematic development in Hebrides Overture, with staccato articulation

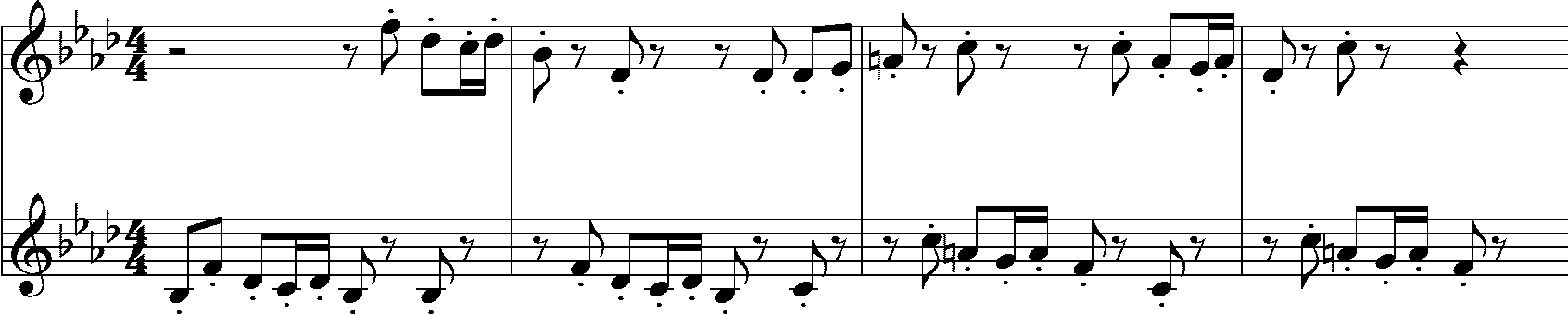
Thematic development in Hebrides Overture, with staccato articulation

== Procedure ==
=== Brass and woodwind instruments ===
Woodwind and brass instruments generally produce articulations by tonguing, the use of the tongue to break the airflow into the instrument.

Certain palate cues can help student musicians master articulations. For example, the syllable "dah" demonstrates one placement of the tongue to articulate notes. In most cases, using the near tip of the tongue, is the best way of articulation. However, different articulation markings require different tongue placement. Smooth, connected passages may require an articulation more reminiscent of the syllable "la" while heavy, sharp notes may be attacked with an articulation similar to "tah".

Furthermore, the implementation of double-tonguing may be required when many articulations are required in rapid succession. Double-tonguing can be simulated by repeating the syllables "dig" and "guh" in rapid succession. Other syllables for double tonguing are "tuh" and "kuh," "tih" and "kuh," and any other combination of syllables that use the tip of the tongue behind the front teeth and then the back of the tongue against the back of the mouth. Double-tonguing is an articulation primarily used by brass players, but the use of double-tonguing by woodwind players is becoming more common.

A third, rare form of articulation for wind players is "doodle tonguing". The name of this articulation comes from the sound, doodle, one would make if she were to sound her voice while performing the articulation. Doodle-tonguing is achieved by moving the tip of the tongue up and down quickly to block the air stream momentarily on the way up, and again on the way down.

=== Stringed instruments ===
Stringed instruments use different techniques such as bowing, picking, or a technique by plucking the strings with the hand. This technique is called pizzicato. String instruments use these methods to achieve different articulations, varying the speed, pressure, and angle of the bow or pick. Musicians use articulation to create a link between notes, such as legato. Legato is formed by letting the string vibrate without stopping or muting it so the note slurs with the consecutive ones. Staccato is another very common musical articulation found in music. This action is caused by the player plucking, bowing, or picking the note and immediately muting the note so it is shorter than normal. Think of these two as opposites. Duration is indeed the most striking feature of articulation but is not its only one. Articulation describes the forming of a tone in all its facets. This also includes loudness, timbre, intonation, and envelope characteristics. A note is accented by a sort of triangle without its base. A musician using a string instrument would accent a note by playing the string harder and with more attack creating a louder sound.

== Compound articulations ==
Occasionally, articulations can be combined to create stylistically or technically correct sounds. For example, when staccato marks are combined with a slur, the result is portato, also known as articulated legato. Tenuto markings under a slur are called (for bowed strings) hook bows. This name is also less commonly applied to staccato or martellato (martelé) markings.

=== Apagados ===
Apagados (from the Spanish verb apagar, "to mute") refers to notes that are played dampened or "muted", without sustain. The term is written above or below the notes with a dotted or dashed line drawn to the end of the group of notes that are to be played dampened. The technique is chiefly written for bowed or plucked instruments. Modernists refer to the 'apogado' (slightly different spelling) as "palm mute". On the guitar, the musician dampens the strings with the palm of the hand and plucks with the thumb. Strictly speaking, the term dampened is correct for this effect in music; since to mute means to silence. Illustration of the apagados may be found in the work of the composer for Spanish guitar, Gerardo de Altona.

== See also ==
- List of musical symbols: Articulation
- Prosody (music)
- Tonguing

== Bibliography ==
- Cooper, Helen (1985). Basic Guide to How to Read Music. ISBN 0-399-51122-9.
- Rimas, Juozas, Rimas, Juozas Jr. (2024). "Articulation" in Etudes on the Philosophy of Music. Cham, Switzerland: Palgrave Macmillan. ISBN 978-3-031-63965-4 Open Access:
