= Legato =

Indicates that musical notes are played or sung smoothly and connected

A slurred A-minor natural scale. The slur indicates that the scale is played legato.

Bassoon articulations
A bassoon played staccato, legato, legato + vibrato, and slurred

In music performance and notation, legato ([leˈɡaːto]; Italian for "tied together"; French lié; German gebunden) indicates that musical notes are played or sung smoothly, such that the transition from note to note is made with no intervening silence. Legato technique is required for slurred performance, but unlike slurring (as that term is interpreted for some instruments), legato does not forbid articulating the notes with a very slight interruption.

Standard notation indicates legato either with the word legato, or by a slur (a curved line) under notes that form one legato group. The latter notation is differentiated from a tie in that the notes have different pitches. Legato, like staccato, is a kind of articulation.

There is an intermediate non-legato articulation called portato (also mezzo staccato or sometimes non-legato).

== Classical string instruments ==
In music for Classical string instruments, legato is an articulation that often refers to notes played with a full bow, and played with the shortest silence, often barely perceptible, between notes. The player achieves this through controlled wrist movements of the bowing hand, often masked or enhanced with vibrato. Such a legato style of playing can also be associated with portamento.

== Guitar ==
In guitar playing (apart from classical guitar) legato is used interchangeably as a label for both musical articulation and a particular application of technique—playing musical phrases using the fretting hand to play the notes—using techniques such as glissando, string bending, hammer-ons and pull-offs instead of picking to sound the notes. The fact that the same finger is both setting the string vibrating and setting the pitch leads to smoother transitions between notes than when one hand is used to mark pitch while the other strikes the string. Legato technique to provide legato articulation on electric guitar generally requires playing notes that are close and on the same string, following the first note with others that are played by hammer-ons and pull-offs.

Some guitar virtuosos (notably Allan Holdsworth, Shawn Lane and Brett Garsed) developed their legato technique to the extent that they could perform extremely complex passages involving any permutation of notes on a string at extreme tempos, and particularly in the case of Holdsworth, tend to eschew pull-offs entirely for what some feel is a detrimental effect on guitar tone as the string is pulled slightly sideways. The term "hammer-ons from nowhere" is commonly employed when crossing strings and relying solely on fretting hand strength to produce a note but on a plucked string. Many guitar virtuosos are well-versed in the legato technique, as it allows for rapid and "clean" runs. Multiple hammer-ons and pull-offs together are sometimes also referred to colloquially as "rolls", a reference to the fluid sound of the technique. A rapid series of hammer-ons and pull-offs between a single pair of notes is called a trill.

Legato on guitar is commonly associated with playing more notes within a beat than the stated timing, i.e., playing 5 (a quintuplet) or 7 (a septuplet) notes against a quarter-note instead of the usual even number or triplet. This gives the passage an unusual timing and when played slowly an unusual sound. However, this is less noticeable by ear when played fast, as legato usually is. There is a fine line between legato and two-hand finger tapping, in some cases making the two techniques harder to distinguish by ear. Generally, legato adds a more fluid, smooth sound to a passage.

== Synthesizers ==
In synthesizers legato is a type of monophonic operation. In contrast to the typical monophonic mode where every new note articulates the sound by restarting the envelope generators, in legato mode the envelopes are not re-triggered if the new note is played "legato" (with the previous note still depressed). This causes the initial transient from the attack and decay phases to sound only once for an entire legato sequence of notes. Envelopes reaching the sustain stage remain there until the final note is released.

== Vocal music ==
In classical singing, legato means a string of sustained vowels with minimal interruption from consonants. It is a key characteristic of the bel canto singing style that prevailed among voice teachers and singers during the 18th century and the first four decades of the 19th century. Usually referred to as the line, a good, smooth legato is still necessary for successful classical singers. In Western Classical vocal music, singers generally use it on any phrase without explicit articulation marks. Usually the most prevalent issue with vocal legato is maintaining the "line" across registers.
