= Tenuto =

Musical direction and notation

Three notes with tenuto marks

In musical notation, tenuto (Italian, past participle of tenere, 'to hold'), written as a horizontal bar above or below a note, is a direction for the performer to hold or sustain a note for its full length.

Its precise interpretation can be somewhat contextual in practice, especially when combined with dynamic directions affecting loudness. In that case, it can mean either accent the note in question by holding it to its full length (or longer, with slight rubato), or play the note slightly louder. In other words, the tenuto mark may alter the length of a note at the same time a dynamic mark adjusts its volume. Either way, the tenuto marking indicates that a note should receive some degree of emphasis.

Tenuto is one of the earliest directions to appear in music notation. Notker of St. Gall (c. 840–912) discusses the use of the letter t in plainsong notation as meaning trahere vel tenere debere ("one must carry or hold") in one of his letters.

The mark's meaning may also be affected when it appears in conjunction with other durational articulations. When it appears with a staccato dot, it means non legato or detached.

== Notation ==
Tenuto is notated three ways:

1. The word tenuto written above the passage to be played tenuto.
2. The abbreviation ten. written above the note or passage to be played, tenuto.
3. A horizontal line, roughly the length of a notehead, placed immediately above or below the note to be played tenuto.

For clarity, the horizontal line may be slightly further apart from the note under a tenuto, so as to not confuse it with a line of the stave.

== See also ==
- Modern musical symbols
