= Marcato =

Musical instruction

The symbol for a marcato

The vertical wedge on the first note indicates marcato (It. marcatissimo or martellato), while the horizontal wedge on the second indicates an accent (It. marcato).

Marcato (short form: Marc.; Italian for marked) is a musical instruction indicating a note, chord, or passage is to be played louder or more forcefully than the surrounding music. The instruction may involve the word marcato itself written above or below the staff or it may take the form of the symbol ∧, an open vertical wedge. The marcato is essentially a louder and often shorter version of the regular accent > (an open horizontal wedge).

Like the regular accent, however, the marcato is often interpreted to suggest a sharp attack tapering to the original dynamic, an interpretation which applies only to instruments capable of altering the dynamic level of a single sustained pitch. According to author James Mark Jordan, "the marcato sound is characterized by a rhythmic thrust followed by a decay of the sound."

In jazz big-band scores, the marcato symbol usually indicates a note is to be shortened to approximately 2/3 its normal duration, and given a moderate accent.

The instruction marcato or marcatissimo (extreme marcato), among various other instructions, symbols, and expression marks may prompt a string player to use martelé bowing, depending on the musical context. An example is the Gavotte from the Orchestral Suite No. 3, BWV 1068 by J. S. Bach (Suzuki Violin School Vol. 3).
