= Slur (music) =

Symbol in musical notation

An A natural minor scale under a slur

A slur is a symbol in Western musical notation indicating that the notes it embraces are to be played without separation (that is, with legato articulation). A slur is denoted with a curved line generally placed over the notes if the stems point downward, and under them if the stems point upwards.

Prime functions of the slur in keyboard music...are to delineate the extent of a phrase line and to indicate the legato performance of melodies or arpeggiated chords.

Both accents and slurs relate directly to woodwind articulation...(and brass as well) since they employ a variety of tonguing effects [which are indicated by use of, "the correct form," of accents and slurs].

[With bowed string instruments] A curved slur over or under two or more notes indicates that these notes are to be connected...Slurs are only partially indicative of phrasing; if an actual phrase mark is necessary (to unite several bow-strokes into a larger melodic idea), it should be notated above the passage with broken lines.

The example below shows two measures in 6/8 with a slur for each measure:

== Performance ==
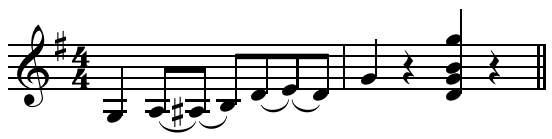
G run in G major variation contains slurs indicating both hammer-ons and a pull-off

Slurs mean different things for different instruments:

- For bowed string instruments, the notes should be played in one bow stroke.
- For plucked string instruments, such as guitars, the notes should be played without plucking the individual strings (hammer-ons and pull-offs).
- For wind instruments, the notes should be played without re-articulating each note (tonguing), except for the slide trombone (and other instruments that control the pitch with a slide), on which only certain kinds of combinations can be played with no tongue without making a glissando – thus "legato tonguing" is employed.
- For vocal music, slurs are usually used to mark notes which are sung to a single syllable (melisma).

A slur can be extended over many notes, sometimes encompassing several bars. In extreme cases, composers are known to write slurs which are near-impossible to achieve; in that case the composer wishes to emphasise that the notes should be performed with as much legato as possible.

== See also ==
- Tie (music) – a similar symbol which combines adjacent notes of the same pitch into a single longer note
- Musical phrasing
