= Staccato =

Form of musical articulation

Three notes with staccato dots

Staccato ([stakˈkaːto]; Italian for 'detached') is a form of musical articulation. In modern notation, it signifies a note of shortened duration, separated from the note that may follow by silence. It has been described by theorists and has appeared in music since at least 1676.

== Notation ==
Music played without staccato

The same music played with staccato

Bassoon articulations
A bassoon played staccato, legato, legato + vibrato, and slurred.

In 20th-century music, a dot placed above or below a note indicates that it should be played staccato, and a wedge is used for the more emphatic staccatissimo. However, before 1850, dots, dashes, and wedges were all likely to have the same meaning, even though some theorists from as early as the 1750s distinguished different degrees of staccato through the use of dots and dashes, with the dash indicating a shorter, sharper note, and the dot a longer, lighter one.

A number of signs came to be used in the late 19th and early 20th centuries to discriminate more subtle nuances of staccato. These signs involve various combinations of dots, vertical and horizontal dashes, vertical and horizontal wedges, and the like, but attempts to standardize these signs have not generally been successful.

The example below illustrates the scope of the staccato dot:

In the first measure, the pairs of notes are in the same musical part (or voice) since they are on a common stem. The staccato applies to both notes of the pairs. In the second measure, the pairs of notes are stemmed separately indicating two different parts, so the staccato applies only to the upper note.

The opposite musical articulation of staccato is legato, signifying long and continuous notes. There is an intermediate articulation called either mezzo staccato or non legato.

For wind and bowed string instruments in particular, staccato is often also associated with a faster attack, potentially involving a different bowing or tonguing technique as appropriate.

== Staccatissimo ==
In musical notation, staccatissimo (plural: staccatissimi or the anglicised form staccatissimos) indicates that the notes are to be played extremely separated and distinct, essentially a superlative staccato. This can be notated with little pikes over or under the notes, depending on stem direction, as in this example from Bruckner's Symphony No. 0 in D minor:

Alternatively, it can be notated by writing the word "staccatissimo" or the abbreviation "staccatiss." over the staff. A few composers, such as Mozart, have used staccato dots accompanied by a written instruction staccatissimo when they mean the passage to be played staccatissimo.

== See also ==
- Glissando
- Legato
- Marcato
- Portato
- Slur (music)
