= Outline of opera =

The following outline is provided as an overview of and topical guide to opera:

Opera is an art form in which singers and musicians perform a dramatic work (called an opera), which combines a text (called a libretto) and a musical score. Opera is part of the Western classical music tradition. While the scale of opera can be larger or smaller—there are many different genres of opera—performance typically involves different types of artist (singers, instrumentalists and often dancers and actors) and technical staff. Usually an orchestra led by a conductor accompanies the singers. In contrast to spoken theatre, the opera world is international. Italian, German, French, English, and Russian works are performed worldwide in their original languages, and artists travel from country to country performing.

The following is a list of articles on general opera topics:

== History of opera ==
- Origins of opera
- Querelle des Bouffons

== Opera in different national traditions ==
Operas have been written in a diversity of languages with many countries or regions developing their own operatic style, tradition and history.

- Italian opera
- Opera in German
- French opera
- Opera in English
- Spanish opera
- Russian opera
- Opera in Dutch
- Finnish opera
- Hungarian opera
- Polish opera
- Opera in Arabic
- Armenian opera
- Albanian opera
- Opera in Azerbaijan
- Opera in Canada
- Opera in Cuba
- Opera in Latin America
- Opera in Scotland
- Opera in Venezuela
- Western opera in Chinese

== Component parts ==
- Overture – Instrumental introduction to an opera, ballet, or oratorio
  - French – Musical form from the Baroque period
  - Italian – Opening orchestral music for operas, operettas and other large scale works
- Aria – Musical piece for a single voice as part of a larger work
  - Aria di sorbetto – Short solo by a secondary character
  - Arioso – Category of classical solo vocal piece
  - Cabaletta – Two-part musical form favored for arias
  - Cantabile – Musical term meaning "songlike"
  - Catalogue aria – Opera aria in which the singer recounts a list of information
  - Da capo aria – Baroque musical form
  - Insertion aria – Aria added to previously unrelated operatic composition
  - Rage aria – Operatic aria expressing rage
- Cavatina – Musical term
- Intermezzo – Opera genre
- Mad scene – Conventional scene depicting madness in opera
- Recitative – Ordinary speech-like singing in opera, cantata, mass or oratorio
- Chorus – On-stage performers other than the featured players
- Ballet – Form of performance dance

== Operatic genres ==
Over the centuries, the original form of opera, as established by Claudio Monteverdi and his contemporaries, has diversified into distinct and recognisable genres, in addition to the national traditions listed above. These include, but are not limited to, the following.

- Azione teatrale
- Ballad opera
- Chamber opera
- Comic opera
- Dramma giocoso
- Duodrama
- Farsa
- Festa teatrale
- Grand opera
- Literaturoper
- Monodrama
- Musikdrama
- Opéra-ballet
- Opera buffa
- Opéra bouffe
- Opéra bouffon
- Opéra comique
- Opéra féerie
- Opera semiseria
- Opera seria
- Operetta
- Pasticcio
- Pastorale héroïque
- Radio opera
- Rescue opera
- Romantische Oper
- Sainete
- Savoy opera
- Science fiction opera
- Semi-opera
- Singspiel
- Spieloper
- Tragédie en musique
- Verismo
- Zarzuela
- Zeitoper

== General opera concepts ==
=== English opera terms ===
- Breeches role
- Chest voice
- Concert performance
- Duodrama
- Head voice
- Insertion aria
- Mad scene
- Melodrama
- Monodrama
- Number
- Opera house
- Patter song
- Prompter
- Sung-through
- Surtitles

=== French opera terms ===
- Claque
- Coup de glotte
- Divertissement
- Encore
- Entr'acte
- Haute-contre
- Intermède
- Overture
- Répétiteur
- Roulade
- Timbre
- Tragédie en musique
- Travesti

=== German opera terms ===
- Fach
- Gesamtkunstwerk
- Kammersänger
- Kapellmeister
- Leitmotif
- Literaturoper
- Regieoper
- Singspiel
- Sitzprobe
- Spieloper
- Sprechgesang

=== Italian opera terms ===
- Aria
- Aria di sorbetto
- Arioso
- Banda
- Bel canto
- Bravura
- Brindisi
- Burletta
- Cabaletta
- Cadenza
- Cantabile
- Castrato
- Cavatina
- Chiaroscuro
- Coloratura
- Comprimario
- Contralto
- Convenienze
- Da capo aria
- Diva
- Falsetto
- Falsettone
- Fioritura
- Impresario
- Intermezzo
- Legato
- Libretto
- Licenza
- Maestro
- Melodramma
- Messa di voce
- Mezzo-soprano
- Musico
- Opera seria
- Ossia
- Passaggio
- Pasticcio
- Portamento
- Prima donna
- Recitative
- Ritornello
- Sinfonia
- Solita forma
- Soprano
- Soprano sfogato
- Spinto
- Squillo
- Stagione
- Stile rappresentativo
- Tenore contraltino
- Tenore di grazia
- Tessitura
- Verismo
- Vibrato

=== Opera terms from other languages ===
- Hovsångare

=== Music concepts relevant to opera ===
- Concert version
- Libretto
  - Electronic libretto
- Offstage instrument or choir part
- Tessitura
- Vocal range
- Vocal weight
- Voice type – classification of singers by the range, weight, and color of their voices
- Voice projection

=== Theatre concepts relevant to opera ===
- Act
- Blocking
- Curtain call
- Prop – short for "theatrical property"
- Rake
- Rehearsal
- Stage clothes
- Stagecraft
- Theatrical scenery
- Ticket

=== Opera house ===
- Auditorium
  - Box
  - Gallery
- Backstage facilities
  - Green room
- Orchestra pit
- Stage
  - Fly system
  - Footlight
  - Prompt corner
  - Revolving stage
  - Safety curtain
  - Stage curtain
  - Star trap

== People in opera ==
=== Opera composers, librettists, directors ===
- List of major opera composers – an annotated compilation of the most frequently named composers on ten lists by opera experts.
- List of opera librettists – inclusive list of libretto writers.
- List of opera directors (in the sense of stage director, not general manager or general director (often also called opera director).

=== Opera singers categories ===
- Boy soprano
- Soprano
  - Coloratura
  - Soubrette
  - Lyric
  - Spinto
  - Dramatic
  - Soprano sfogato
- Mezzo-soprano
- Contralto (Alto)
- Castrato
- Countertenor
  - Sopranist
- Tenor
  - Haute-contre
  - Tenore contraltino
  - Tenore di grazia
- Baritenor
- Baritone
- Bass-baritone
- Bass
  - Basso profondo

=== Participants in opera ===
Opera performer – similar to, but more specialized than performers in other theatrical productions. Opera performers are at the same time both singers and actors, and often dancers as well.

- Ballet dancer
- Choirmaster
- Choreographer
- Costume designer
- Director – in the sense of stage director, not general manager or general director (often also called opera director)
- Dresser
- Banda
- Charge scenic artist
- Dramaturge
- Extra
- Fly crew
- Impresario
- Lighting technician
- Make-up artist
- Opera manager
- Pit orchestra
- Pit orchestra conductor
- Prompter
- Property designer
- Répétiteur
- Set constructor
- Set designer
- Set dresser
- Stagehand
- Stage manager
- Supernumerary actor
- Supporting role singer
- Technician
- Understudy – also called "cover", a singer who prepares to perform a role in case the principal singer is unable to appear.
- Video designer
- Wardrobe supervisor

== Opera lists ==
- List of Christmas operas
- List of fictional literature featuring opera
- List of films based on operas
- List of historical opera characters
- List of prominent operas – an annotated chronological list of operas which are included for their historical significance or widespread popularity (or both).
- List of opera festivals
- List of opera genres
- List of opera houses – lists opera houses by name (or name of performing arts centres in which they are located, if appropriate and best known that way).
- List of operas by composer – an extended list of more than 2,300 works by more than 720 composers.
- List of operas by title – an alphabetical list by title of operas with Wikipedia articles.
- List of operas set in the Crusades
- List of Orphean operas – list of operas dealing with the myth of Orpheus.
- List of radio operas
- List of television operas
- Lists of opera companies

== Opera discographies ==
- Opera discographies

== Books about opera ==
- The Complete Opera Book
- The New Grove Dictionary of Opera
- Opera and Drama

== Films about opera ==
- Il Bacio di Tosca
- Karajan: The Maestro and His Festival
- Pappano's Essential Ring Cycle
- This is Opera
- Wagner's Dream

== See also ==
- Glossary of music terminology – list of music topics, with definitions for ease of reference
- Country house opera – Opera performed at a country house
- Opera film – Recording of an opera on film
- List of classical music concerts with an unruly audience response
