= Prompter =

A prompter may refer to:

- Prompter (opera), a hidden person who tells a singer the first words of each phrase to be sung
- Prompter (theatre), a person hidden from the audience who reminds actors of their lines if they are forgotten
- Teleprompter, a display device that prompts the person speaking with an electronic visual text of a speech or script
