= Jack Jaggs and Dum Dum =

- Directed by: Georges Méliès
- Starring: Georges Méliès
- Production company: Star Film Company
- Release date: 1903
- Country: France
- Language: Silent

Tom Tight et Dum Dum, known in English as Jack Jaggs and Dum Dum and as The Rival Music Hall Artistes, is a 1903 French short silent film by Georges Méliès.

== Plot ==
Dum Dum, an eccentric music hall clown, enters a stage set complete with footlights and a prompter's box. He assembles a mannequin on a bench, and begins to dance. A rival clown in a frock coat enters and attempts to take control of the stage. The annoyed Dum Dum tries various ways of getting his rival off, ranging from angry shouting to spraying him with water. Finally, with a huge mallet, he manages to hammer his rival out of sight. Dum Dum then performs an elaborate magic trick in which the mannequin is disassembled, transformed into a living ballerina, and then turned back into parts. Dum Dum attempts to bow, but the rival clown appears once more. Enraged, Dum Dum hurls his rival into the pile of mannequin parts, from which he emerges dressed in a piecemeal combination of the frock coat and the ballet tutu.

== Production and release ==
Méliès plays Dum Dum in the film, the special effects for which are created with stage machinery and substitution splices. The film was sold by Méliès's Star Film Company and is numbered 508–509 in its catalogues; it was sold in the United States as Jack Jaggs and Dum Dum and in Britain as The Rival Music Hall Artistes.

== Themes ==
In a history of French film, the cultural historian Richard Abel highlights the film's combination of music hall comedy and trick film effects, as well as the gender-related imagery. Abel concludes: "Not only is the human body for Méliès under constant threat of breakdown and disintegration, but it also is so malleable as to be capable of instantaneously switching gender, its identity finally defined as equally male and female."
