= Prompt corner =

Part of a theatre

An modern prompt corner, featuring a Show control panel, an Intercom panel, a live camera feed, and an audio monitor

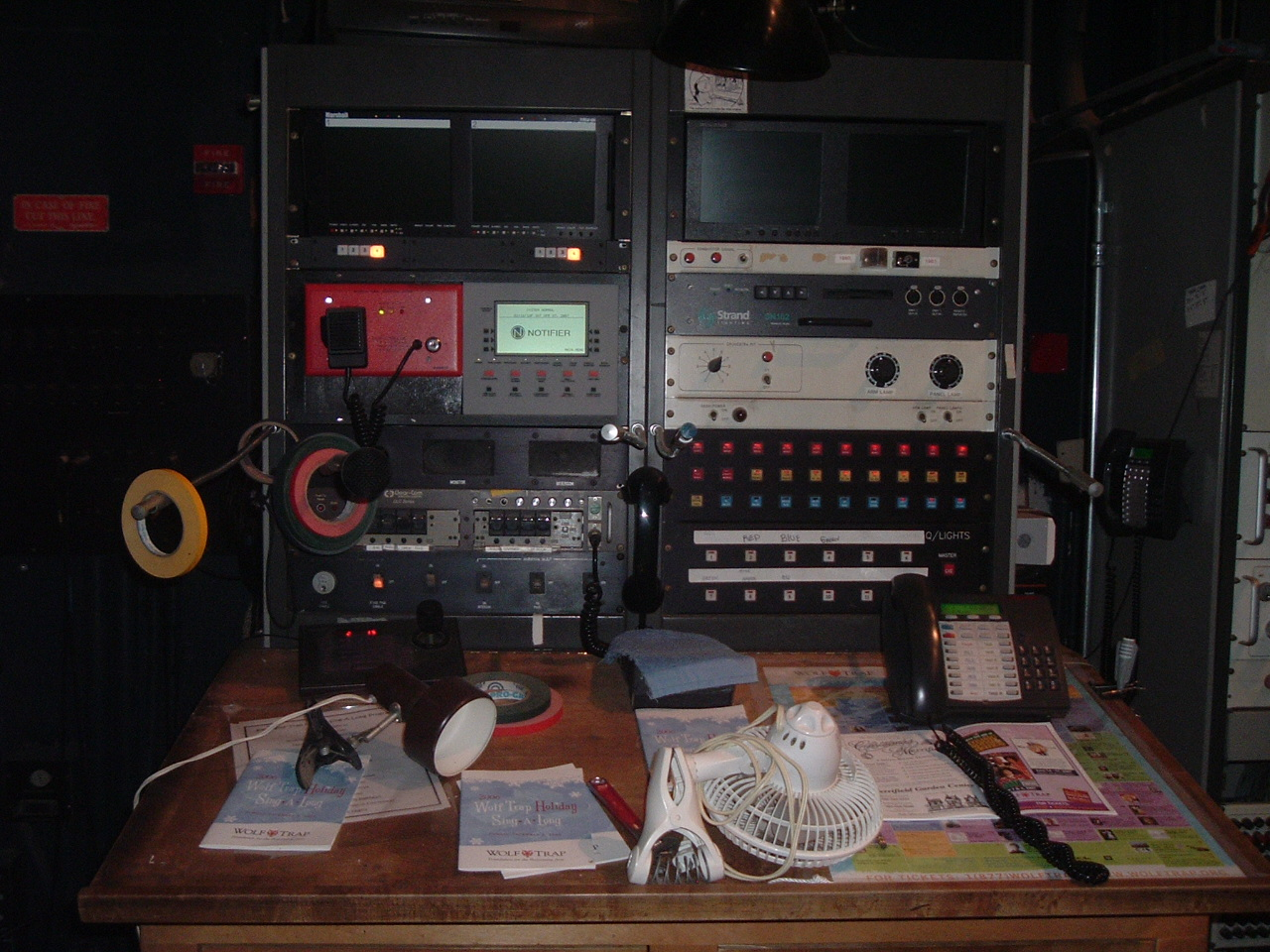
Part of the stage manager's panel which is often present in the prompt corner

In a theatre, the prompt corner or prompt box is the place where the prompter—usually the stage manager in the US or deputy stage manager in the UK—stands in order to coordinate the performance and to remind performers of their lines when required. It is traditionally located at stage left.

== Location ==
Historically, the prompt corner was situated at stage left. Prompt side (abbreviated to PS) and opposite prompt (abbreviated to OP, sometimes called off prompt) are widely used terms for stage left and stage right. However some theatres choose to install prompt corner in a discreet area of the auditorium. Certain theatres which locate their prompt corner on stage right would inform cast and crew that they were operating on a bastard prompt system.

In opera houses, the prompt box is traditionally located downstage centre; see prompter (opera).

== Prompt desk ==
The prompt corner is usually equipped with a prompt desk to facilitate the coordination of a performance. This can vary from a small table in the wings to an elaborate installation in a dedicated booth, being equipped with all the necessary aids for the specific production and venue. The prompt desk minimally holds a carefully annotated copy of the performance script, with blocking and other stage directions and, in professional theatres:

- A communications intercom headset, or 'cans', to talk to the rest of the technical team during a show;
- Red and green cue lights. (In some theatres a computerised cue light system is used);
- Telephones to front of house areas;
- A public address system so that the stage manager and deputy stage manager (normally the person calling the show) can make announcements, or give calls, to the foyer ('front of house'), auditorium ('house'), dressing rooms or other 'back of house' areas in the theatre;
- A silent fire alarm indicator, such as a strobe light; and,
- Controls for the safety curtain and other emergency measures.
