= Lucia di Lammermoor =

1835 opera by Gaetano Donizetti

- Opera by Gaetano Donizetti
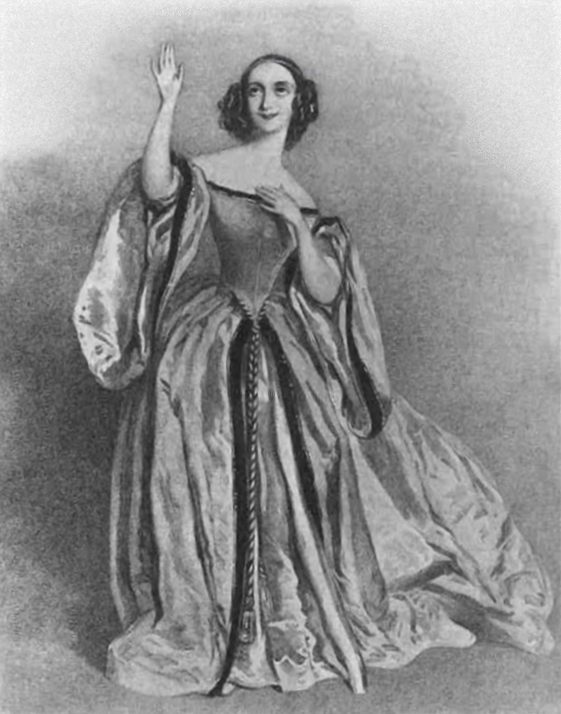
- Fanny Tacchinardi Persiani as Lucia in the London premiere in 1838
- Librettist: Salvadore Cammarano
- Language: Italian
- Based on: The Bride of Lammermoor by Walter Scott
- Premiere: 26 September 1835; Teatro di San Carlo, Naples

Lucia di Lammermoor (Italian pronunciation: [luˈtʃiːa di ˈlammermur]) is a dramma tragico (tragic opera) in three acts by Italian composer Gaetano Donizetti. Salvadore Cammarano wrote the Italian-language libretto loosely based upon Walter Scott's 1819 historical novel The Bride of Lammermoor.

Donizetti wrote Lucia di Lammermoor in 1835, when he was reaching the peak of his reputation as an opera composer. Gioachino Rossini had recently retired and Vincenzo Bellini had died shortly before the premiere of Lucia leaving Donizetti as "the sole reigning genius of Italian opera". Not only were conditions ripe for Donizetti's success as a composer, but there was also a widespread interest in the history and culture of Scotland. The perceived romance of its violent wars and feuds, as well as its folklore and mythology, intrigued 19th century readers and audiences. Walter Scott dramatized these elements in his novel The Bride of Lammermoor, which inspired several musical works including Lucia.

The story concerns the emotionally fragile Lucy Ashton (Lucia) who is caught in a feud between her own family and that of the Ravenswoods. The setting is the Lammermuir Hills of Scotland (Lammermoor) in the 17th century.

== Performance history ==
=== 19th century ===
The opera premiered on 26 September 1835 at the Teatro di San Carlo in Naples. However, John Black notes that "the surprising feature of its subsequent performance history is that it established so slowly in the Neapolitan repertoire", noting that while there were 18 performances in the rest of 1835, there were only four in 1836, 16 in 1837, two in 1838, and continuing in this manner with only two in each of 1847 and 1848.

London saw the opera on 5 April 1838 and, for Paris, Donizetti revised the score for a French version which debuted on 6 August 1839 at the Théâtre de la Renaissance in Paris. It reached the United States with a production in New Orleans on 28 May 1841.

=== 20th century and beyond ===
The opera was never absent from the repertory of the Metropolitan Opera for more than one season at a time from 1903 until 1972. After World War II, a number of sopranos were instrumental in giving new life to the opera, including Maria Callas (with performances from 1954 at La Scala and Berlin in 1955 under Herbert von Karajan) and Joan Sutherland (with 1959 and 1960 performances at the Royal Opera House Covent Garden).

It has remained a staple of the operatic repertoire.

An aria from the opera, "Il dolce suono", is mentioned in E.M. Forster's Where Angels Fear to Tread. It is also featured in Luc Besson's film The Fifth Element. The Act 2 sextet features prominently in Scorsese's film The Departed.

== Roles ==
Role	Voice type	Premiere cast
Miss Lucia	soprano	Fanny Tacchinardi Persiani
Lord Enrico Ashton, Lord of Lammermoor; Lucia's brother	baritone	Domenico Cosselli
Sir Edgardo di Ravenswood	tenor	Gilbert Duprez
Lord Arturo Bucklaw	tenor	Balestrieri
Raimondo Bidebent, a Calvinist chaplain	bass	Carlo Ottolini Porto
Alisa, Lucia's handmaid	mezzo-soprano	Teresa Zappucci
Normanno, a huntsman; a retainer of Enrico	tenor	Anafesto Rossi

== Instrumentation ==
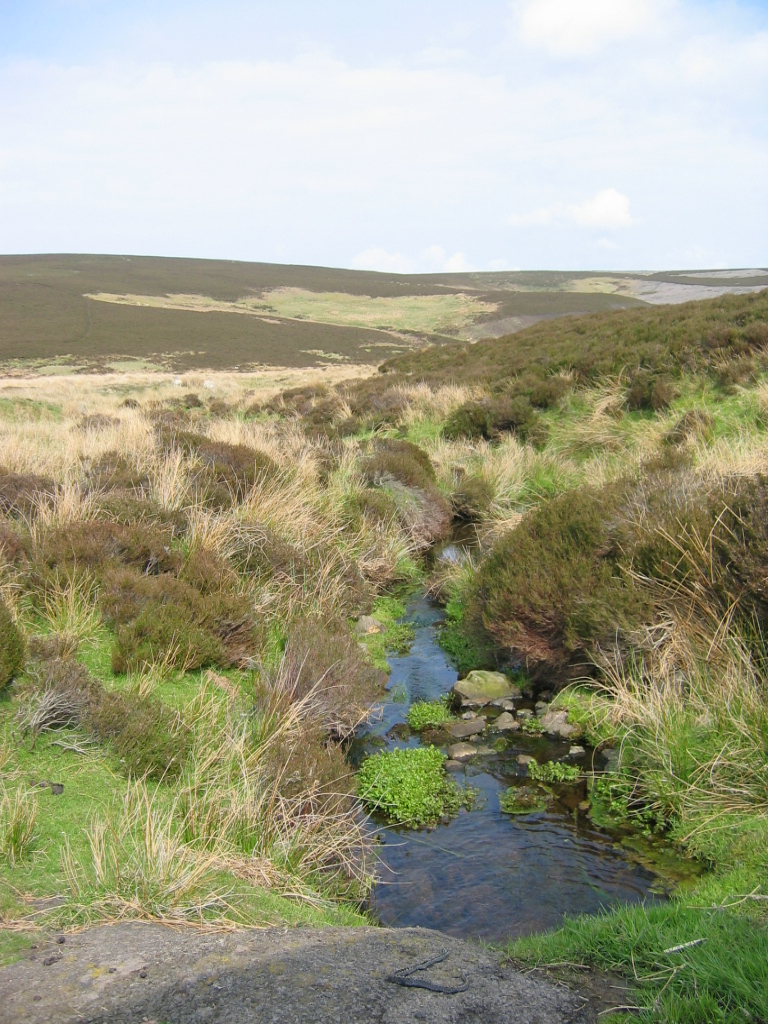
Lammermuir Hills, Scotland

The instrumentation is:

- Woodwinds: piccolo, 2 flutes, 2 oboes, 2 clarinets and 2 bassoons
- Brass: 4 horns, 2 trumpets, and 3 trombones
- Percussion: timpani, triangle, bass drum, cymbals and campana (tubular bells)
- Strings: harp, first violins, second violins, violas, violoncellos and double basses.

Additionally an off-stage wind band is used; Donizetti did not provide instrumentation. Also, occasionally the glass harmonica is substituted for solo flute in Lucia's mad scene, per Donizetti's original score.

== Synopsis ==
- Time: 17th century
- Place: Scotland

=== Act 1 ===
Scene 1: The gardens of Lammermoor Castle

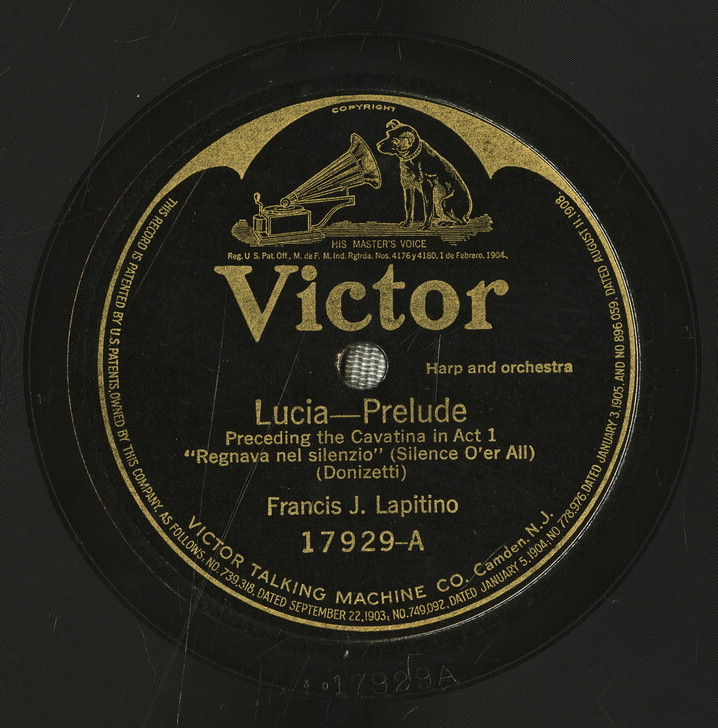

Harp solo, composed by Donizetti, preceding the aria "Regnava nel silenzio"
Performed by Francis J. Lapitino, 1915 (2:11)

Normanno, captain of the castle guard, and other retainers are searching for an intruder. He tells Enrico that he believes that the man is Edgardo of Ravenswood, and that he comes to the castle to meet Enrico's sister, Lucia. It is confirmed that Edgardo is indeed the intruder. Enrico reaffirms his hatred for the Ravenswood family and his determination to end the relationship.

Scene 2: By a fountain at the entrance to the park, beside the castle

Lucia waits for Edgardo. In her famous aria "Regnava nel silenzio", Lucia tells her maid Alisa that she has seen the ghost of a girl killed on the very same spot by a jealous Ravenswood ancestor. Alisa tells Lucia that the apparition is a warning and that she must give up her love for Edgardo. Edgardo enters; for political reasons, he must leave immediately for France. He hopes to make his peace with Enrico and marry Lucia. Lucia tells him this is impossible, and instead they take a sworn vow of marriage and exchange rings. Edgardo leaves.

=== Act 2 ===
Scene 1: Lord Ashton's apartments

Preparations have been made for the imminent wedding of Lucia to Arturo. Enrico worries about whether Lucia will really submit to the wedding. He shows his sister a forged letter seemingly proving that Edgardo has forgotten her and taken a new lover. Enrico leaves Lucia to further persuasion, this time by Raimondo, Lucia's chaplain and tutor, that she should renounce her vow to Edgardo, for the good of the family, and marry Arturo.

Scene 2: A hall in the castle

Arturo arrives for the marriage. Lucia seems distressed, but Enrico explains that this is due to the death of her mother. Arturo signs the marriage contract, followed reluctantly by Lucia. At that point Edgardo suddenly appears in the hall, which leads to the celebrated sextet Chi mi frena in tal momento. Raimondo prevents a fight, and he shows Edgardo Lucia's signature on the marriage contract. Edgardo curses her, demanding that they return their rings to each other. He tramples his ring on the ground, before being forced out of the castle.

=== Act 3 ===
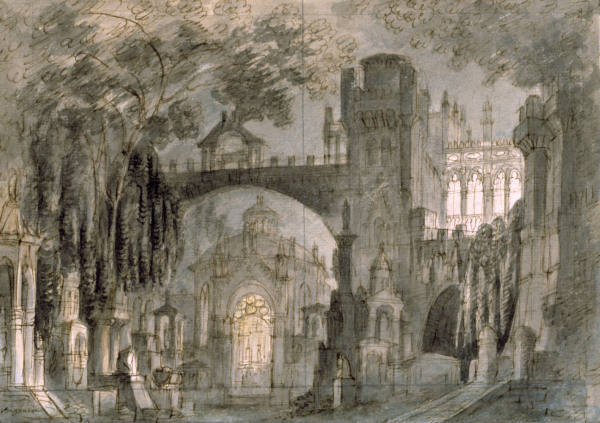
Set design for act 3, scene 3 by Francesco Bagnara, circa 1844 (Civica Raccolta Stampe Bertarelli Milan)

Scene 1: Wolfcrag

Enrico visits Edgardo to challenge him to a duel. He tells him that Lucia is already enjoying her bridal bed. Edgardo agrees to fight him. They will meet later by the graveyard of the Ravenswoods, near the Wolf's Crag.

Scene 2: A Hall

Raimondo interrupts the marriage celebrations to tell the guests that Lucia has gone mad and killed her bridegroom Arturo. Lucia enters. In the aria "Il dolce suono" she imagines being with Edgardo, soon to be happily married. Enrico enters and at first threatens Lucia but later softens when he realizes her condition. Lucia collapses. Raimondo blames Normanno for precipitating the whole tragedy.

Scene 3: The graveyard of the Ravenswood family

Edgardo is resolved to kill himself on Enrico's sword. He learns that Lucia is dying and then Raimondo comes to tell him that she has already died. Edgardo stabs himself with a dagger, hoping to be reunited with Lucia in heaven.

== Music ==
=== The "mad scene" ===
The cabaletta "Spargi d'amaro pianto" following the more lyrical "Il dolce suono" from the "mad scene" (Act 3, Scene 2), has historically been a vehicle for several coloratura sopranos (providing a breakthrough for Dame Joan Sutherland) and is a technically and expressively demanding piece. Donizetti originally wrote it in F major, but it is often transposed down a tone (two half-steps) into E♭. Some sopranos, including Ruth Welting, Mariella Devia, Mady Mesplé, and Lily Pons have sung the "mad scene" in Donizetti's original F major key, although E♭ is more commonly heard.

Other sopranos, such as Katia Ricciarelli and Montserrat Caballé, have performed the scene in a come scritto ("as written") fashion, adding minimal ornamentation to their interpretations (in the case of Caballé even performing the mad scene in its original F major). Most sopranos, however, add ornamentation to demonstrate their technical ability, as was the tradition in the bel canto period. This involves the addition and interpolation of trills, mordents, turns, runs and cadenzas. Almost all sopranos append cadenzas to the end of the "mad scene", sometimes ending them on a high keynote (E♭ or F, depending on the key in which they are singing, though Mado Robin takes an even higher B♭).

The original scoring of this scene was for glass harmonica and soprano. However, an adaptation for flute and the soprano soloist has been more commonly performed since, mostly for practical reasons. Glass harmonica players Sascha Reckert and Philipp Alexander Marguerre resuscitated Gaetano Donizetti's vision in 2006 at the Opera La Scala in Milan, accompanying Mariella Devia, and have since brought Donizetti's original score back to all major opera houses, including the venue of its premiere, Teatro di San Carlo. Friedrich Heinrich Kern, who has been collaborating with Reckert and Marguerre as Ensemble Sinfonia di Vetro, started to revive the original performance practice in the United States, recently featured in Lucia di Lammermoor productions at the Metropolitan Opera, Santa Fe Opera, and Opera Philadelphia.

The popular soprano and flute duet cadenza was composed in 1888 by Mathilde Marchesi for her student Nellie Melba's performance of the role, requiring ten weeks of rehearsal for the new addition and causing a critical reevaluation and surge of new interest in the opera.

=== List of arias and musical numbers ===
The index of Bonynge's edition lists the following numbers.

1. "Preludio"
Act 1
2. "Percorrete le spiaggie vicine"
3. "Tu sei turbato!"
4. "Cruda, funesta smania" (Enrico)
5. "La pietade in suo favore" (Enrico)
6. "Ancor non giunse!" (Lucia)
7. "Regnava nel silenzio" (Lucia)
8. "Quando rapito in estasi" (Lucia)
9. "Egli s'avanza" (Alisa, Edgardo, Lucia)
10. "Sulla tomba che rinserra" (Edgardo, Lucia)
11. "Qui di sposa eterna fede... Ah! Verranno a te sull'aure" (Edgardo, Lucia)

Act 2
12. "Lucia, fra poco a te verrà"
13. "Appressati, Lucia"
14. "Il pallor funesto, orrendo"
15. "Soffriva nel pianto"
16. "Che fia"
17. "Se tradirmi tu potrai"
18. "Ebben? – Di tua speranza"
19. "Ah! cedi, cedi" (Raimondo)
20. "Al ben de' tuoi qual vittima" (Raimondo)
21. "Per te d'immenso giubilo"
22. "Dov'è Lucia?"
23. "Chi mi frena in tal momento" (sextet)
24. "T'allontana sciagurato"

Act 3
25. "Orrida è questa notte"
26. "Qui del padre ancor respira"
27. "D'immenso giubilo"
28. "Ah! cessate quel contento"
29. "Oh! qual funesto avvenimento!"
30. "Oh, giusto cielo!... Il dolce suono" (Lucia, "Mad Scene")
31. "Ohimè! sorge il tremendo fantasma"
32. "S'avanza Enrico"
33. "Spargi d'amaro pianto"
34. "Si tragga altrove"
35. "Tombe degli avi miei" (Edgardo)
36. "Fra poco a me ricovero"
37. "Oh meschina!"
38. "Tu che a Dio spiegasti l'ali" (Edgardo)

== Lucie de Lammermoor (French version) ==
After Lucia di Lammermoor was produced in Paris, a French version in four acts was commissioned for the Théâtre de la Renaissance in Paris. Donizetti was living there at the time, preparing the revision of Poliuto into its French version (which became Les Martyrs). Lucie opened on 6 August 1839 and this version toured extensively throughout France. The libretto, written by Alphonse Royer and Gustave Vaëz, is not simply a translation, as Donizetti altered some of the scenes and characters. One of the more notable changes is the disappearance of Alisa, Lucia's handmaid and confidante. This allows the French version to isolate Lucia, thus increasing the story's emotional impact. Furthermore, Lucia loses most of Raimondo's support; his role is dramatically diminished while Arturo's is increased. Donizetti also added a new character, Gilbert, who is loosely based on the huntsman in the Italian version. However, Gilbert is a more developed figure who serves both Edgardo and Enrico, divulging their secrets to the other for money.

The French version is performed far less frequently than the Italian, but it was revived to great acclaim by Natalie Dessay and Roberto Alagna at the Opéra National de Lyon in 2002. It was co-produced by the Boston Lyric Opera and the Glimmerglass Opera. Sarah Coburn sang the title role as her first "Lucia" in this French version in 2005. In 2008 Lucie was produced by the Cincinnati Opera with Coburn again in the title role.

== Recordings ==
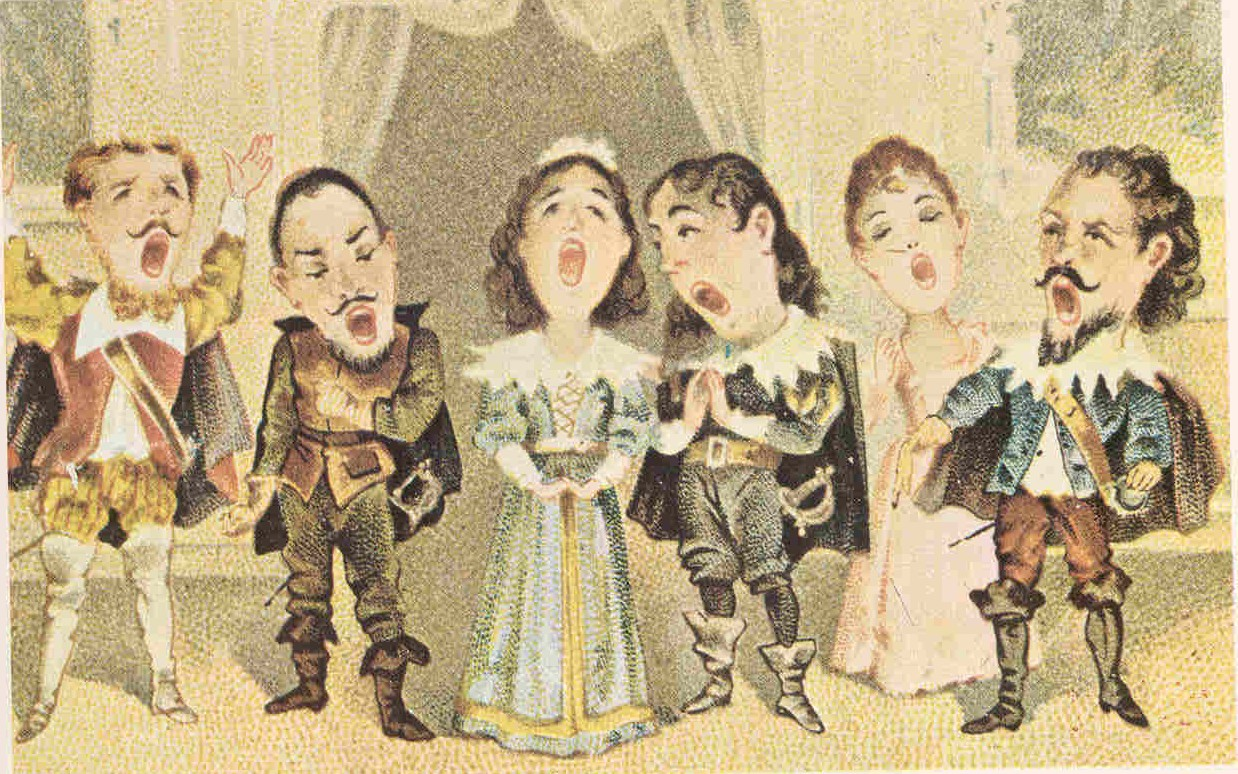
A caricature of the "Lucia Sextet", circa 1900 (Civica Raccolta Stampe Bertarelli Milan)

Lucia has received over twenty commercial studio recordings, and dozens more of live performances. Among these, two of the French versions and one of the original Italian edition are translated into English. The earliest complete recording was made in 1929 with Lorenzo Molajoli conducting the La Scala Orchestra and Chorus and Mercedes Capsir in the title role. There are several recordings with Maria Callas in the title role, including two studio versions conducted by Tullio Serafin (1953 and 1959) and two live versions by Herbert von Karajan (1954 and 1955). Joan Sutherland, who was particularly noted for performances as Lucia, has also been recorded in the role several times including a 1971 Decca Records recording conducted by Richard Bonynge with Luciano Pavarotti as Edgardo. In 2002, Chandos Records released the English version with David Parry conducting and Elizabeth Futral as Lucia. Several video recordings have also been released, including one in French. Charles Mackerras returned to Donizetti's autograph score and prepared a new edition of the score. He returned to the original key structure, and the Mad Scene is quite different. He recorded this version for Sony in 1997. Another recording is Diana Damrau's along with Joseph Calleja in the role of Edgardo and Ludovic Tézier as Enrico.
