= Maestro =

Title of respect given to a master musician

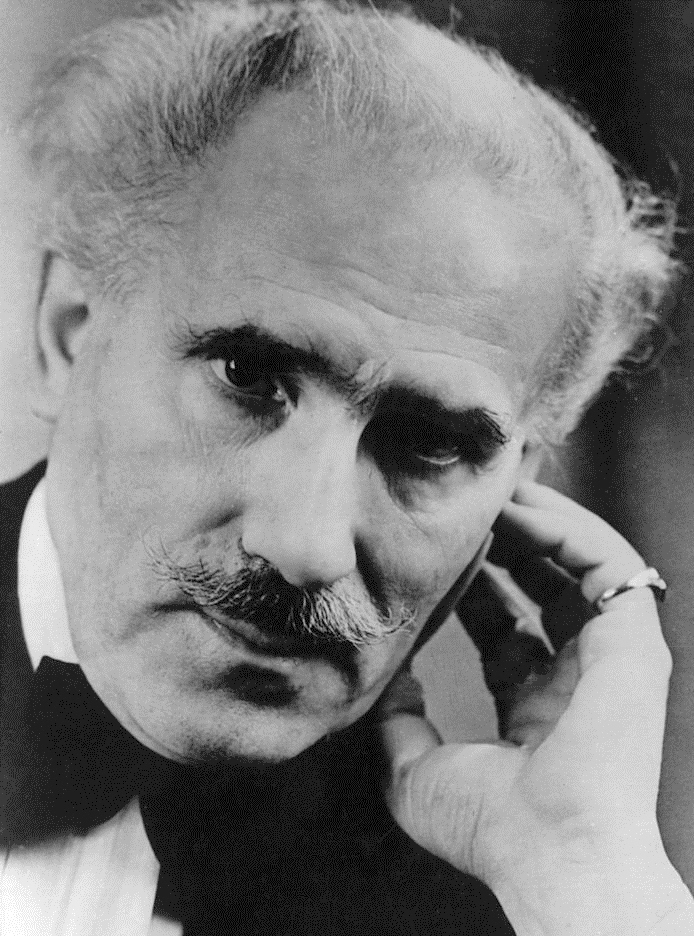
Arturo Toscanini was a famous Italian Maestro

Maestro (/ˈmaɪstroʊ/ MY-stroh; from the Italian maestro [maˈestro, maˈɛstro], meaning 'master' or 'teacher', plural: maestros or maestri) is an honorific title of respect, sometimes abbreviated Mo. The term is most commonly used in the context of Western classical music and opera, in line with the ubiquitous use of Italian musical terms. The feminine form of the word is maestra (pl. maestre).

The word is often used outside of music to refer to individuals of great skill or virtuosity. Roger Federer, one of the greatest tennis players of all time, is nicknamed "the Swiss Maestro" by fans.

== In music ==
The word maestro is most often used in addressing or referring to conductors. Less frequently, it might refer to respected composers, performers, impresarios, musicologists, and music teachers.

In the world of Italian opera, the title is also used to designate a number of positions within the orchestra and company that have specific duties during rehearsal and performance. These include:

- Maestro sostituto or maestro collaboratore: musicians who act as répétiteurs and assistant conductors during performances.
- Maestro concertatore: the keyboard continuo player, who prepares singers and leads rehearsals.
- Maestro direttore: the leader of the first violins of the orchestra (see concertmaster), who may also have administrative duties such as hiring and paying musicians.
- Maestro suggeritore: the prompter.

== See also ==
- Maestro di cappella, literally "chapel-master"
- Pandit
- Ustad
