= Ramon Gener Sala =

Spanish popularizer of music and art

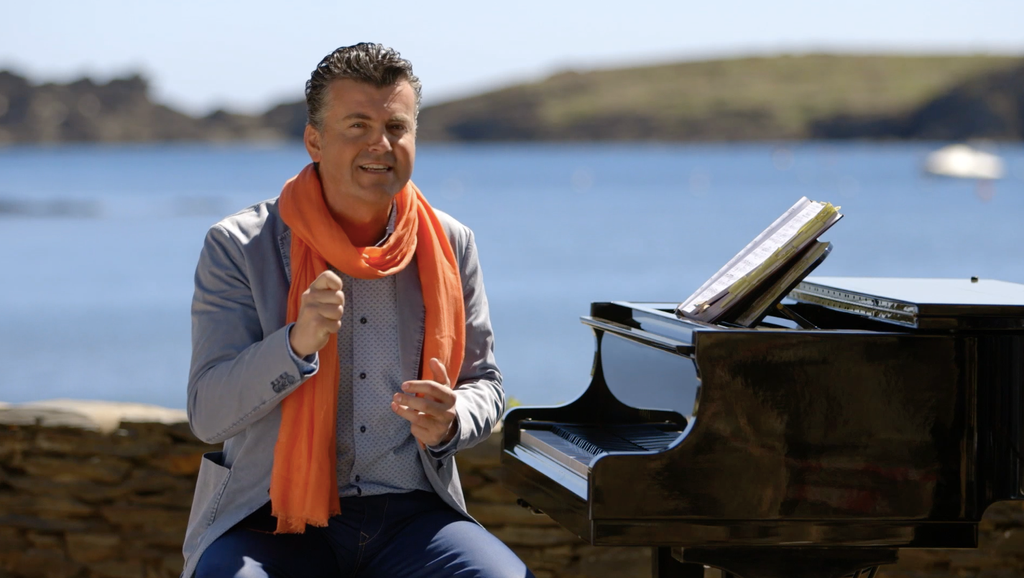
- Ramon Gener Sala presenting This Is Opera
- Born: Barcelona, Spain
- Occupations: opera singer, musician, pianist, humanist and writer
- Awards: Ramon Llull Award (2024)

Ramon Gener Sala (born in Barcelona, 1967), known simply as Ramon Gener, is a Spanish musician, pianist, humanist and writer. A BA in Humanities and Business Sciences, he also studied piano and singing. After some years working as a baritone he left the profession and started his new stage as a lecturer and musical communicator. In 2011 he became the host of the television program Òpera en Texans (Opera in jeans). Later he directed and hosted This is Opera (2015), This is Art (2017, 2018) and 200; una noche en el Prado (2019).

== Early life and education ==
Gener Sala began studying music at the age of 6 at the Conservatori Superior de Música del Liceu in his hometown of Barcelona where he studied piano until he was 11 years old. After a break in his teens, he resumed his piano studies at the age of 18 with the pianist Anna Maria Albors and began studying opera singing under the supervision of the famous soprano Victoria de los Ángeles. He completed his studies with the baritone Jerzy Artysz in Warsaw and in Barcelona with the tenor Eduard Giménez i Gràcia. While studying piano and singing, he graduated in Humanities and Business Sciences from the Open University of Catalonia.

== Career ==
Gener Sala debuted as a singer at the Palau de la Música Catalana in the role of protagonist in the opera Noye's Fludde by Benjamin Britten. Thereafter he worked as a baritone in oratorios including Fauré's Requiem, Stabat Mater by Franz Schubert and Bach's Magnificat and operas such as Le nozze di Figaro, Così fan tutte (Guglielmo) and The Magic Flute (Sprecher). In the 1999/2000 season he made his debut at the Gran Teatre del Liceu with Sly, ovvero La leggenda del dormiente risvegliato by Ermanno Wolf-Ferrari. In the 2000/01 season he returned there to sing at the opera Billy Budd by Benjamin Brittten.

Later he stopped singing but continued giving courses and lectures on music history and opera. The impact of these conferences took him to television.

In 2011, the program Opera en texans (Opera in jeans) premiered on channel 33, where Gener Sala explained and analyzed opera informally. The program was on air for three seasons and was awarded at the XVII Zapping Awards 2011 edition granted by "Telespectadors Associats de Catalunya" – TAC (Mix Partners Viewers of Catalonia) in the category of best informative program / cultural / documentary.

In 2014, Gener Sala published a book written in Catalan, Si Beethoven pogués escoltar-me (If Beethoven could listen to me). A year later the book was published in Spanish.

In 2015, Gener Sala directed and led the program This is Opera: an international production (Brutal Media TV, RTVE and Unitel Classica) with 30 episodes recorded in Spanish and English. He is master of ceremonies, expert, pianist and animator. In Spain it was broadcast on La 2 of RTVE. The program has also been issued in Germany, Austria and Switzerland (Servus TV), Italy (RAI5), Portugal (RTP2), Latvia (LTV and Lattelecom), Croatia (HTV3), Australia (Foxtel Arts) Mexico (Channel 22 Film & Arts) Colombia, Chile and Argentina (Film & Arts), South Korea (NATV), Mongolia (MNB), Singapore (Channel 5) and Czech Republic (CT art). The program was awarded at the XXI edition of the Zapping Awards as the best informative program / cultural / documentary and Ramon Gener won the award for best presenter.

In 2016 Sala published, in Catalan and Spanish, his second book L'amor et farà immortal (Love will make you immortal).

== Awards and honours ==
- Ramon Llull Award for Història d'un piano (2024)

== Bibliography ==
- Si Beethoven pogués escoltar-me (2014) In Catalan. Editorial Ara Llibres
- Si Beethoven pudiera escucharme (2015) In Spanish. Editorial Now Books
- El amor the hará inmortal (2016) In Spanish. Editorial Plaza & Janés
- L'amor et fará immortal (2016) In Catalan. Editorial Ara llibres
- Se Beethoven pudesse ouvir-me (2017) In Portuguese. Editora Objectiva

== TV shows ==
- Òpera en texans (2011, 2012, 2013). Host. Produced by Brutal Media for TV3
- This is Opera (2015). Director and host. Produced by Brutal Media, RTVE y Unitel Classica.
- This is Art (2017 y 2018). Director and host. Produced by Brutal Media, TV3 y Movistar+
- 200; una noche en el Prado (2019). Director and host. Produced by Brutal Media for RTVE
