= Il dolce suono =

Aria from Lucia di Lammermoor

"Il dolce suono" (Italian for 'The Sweet Sound') is the incipit of the recitativo of a scena ed aria taken from Act III scene 2, Lucia di Lammermoor by Gaetano Donizetti. It is also commonly known as the "mad scene" sung by the leading soprano, Lucia.

Lucia descends into madness, and on her wedding night, while the festivities are still being held in the Great Hall, she stabs her new husband, Arturo, in the bridal chamber. Disheveled, unaware of what she has done, she wanders in the Great Hall, recalling her meetings with Edgardo and imagining herself married to him.

Donizetti intended the aria to be accompanied by the eerie sound of the glass harmonica, though this instrument is often replaced in performance by a flute.

An arrangement of the aria was featured in the film The Fifth Element, sung by the alien character Diva Plavalaguna voiced by Inva Mula. Russian pop countertenor Vitas recorded a similar shortened version under the title "Lucia Di Lammermoor". While singing the part, Vitas changed the lyric "Edgardo" to "Esther" (hence the text "Esther! io ti son reso!").

== Libretto ==
Il dolce suono mi colpì di sua voce!
Ah, quella voce m'è qui nel cor discesa!
Edgardo! io ti son resa. Edgardo! Ah! Edgardo, mio! Si', ti son resa!
fuggita io son da' tuoi nemici.
Un gelo me serpeggia nel sen!
trema ogni fibra!
vacilla il piè!
Presso la fonte meco t'assidi alquanto! Si', Presso la fonte meco t'assidi.
Ohimè, sorge il tremendo fantasma e ne separa!
Qui ricovriamo, Edgardo, a piè dell'ara.
Sparsa è di rose!

Un'armonia celeste, di', non ascolti?
Ah, l'inno suona di nozze!
Il rito per noi s'appresta! Oh, me felice!
Oh gioia che si sente, e non si dice!
Ardon gl'incensi!
Splendon le sacre faci, splendon intorno!
Ecco il ministro!
Porgimi la destra!
Oh lieto giorno!
Al fin son tua, al fin sei mio,
a me ti dona un Dio.
Ogni piacer più grato,
mi fia con te diviso
Del ciel clemente un riso
la vita a noi sarà.

The sweet sound of his voice struck me!
Ah, that voice has entered my heart!
Edgardo! I surrender to you, oh my Edgardo!
I have escaped from your enemies.
A chill creeps into my breast!
Every fibre trembles!
My foot falters!
Sit down by the fountain with me a while!
Alas, the tremendous phantom arises and separates us!
Let us take refuge here, Edgardo, at the foot of the altar.
It is scattered with roses!

A heavenly harmony, tell me, do you not hear it?
Ah, the marriage hymn is playing!
They are preparing the rite for us! Oh, how happy I am!
Oh joy that is felt but not said!
The incense is burning!
The holy torches are shining, shining around!
Here is the minister!
Give me your right hand!
Oh joyful day!
At last I am yours, at last you are mine,
A god gives you to me.
Let me share
The greatest pleasures with you,
Life for us will be
A smile from merciful heaven.
