= Prompter (theatre) =

Person who prompts or cues actors

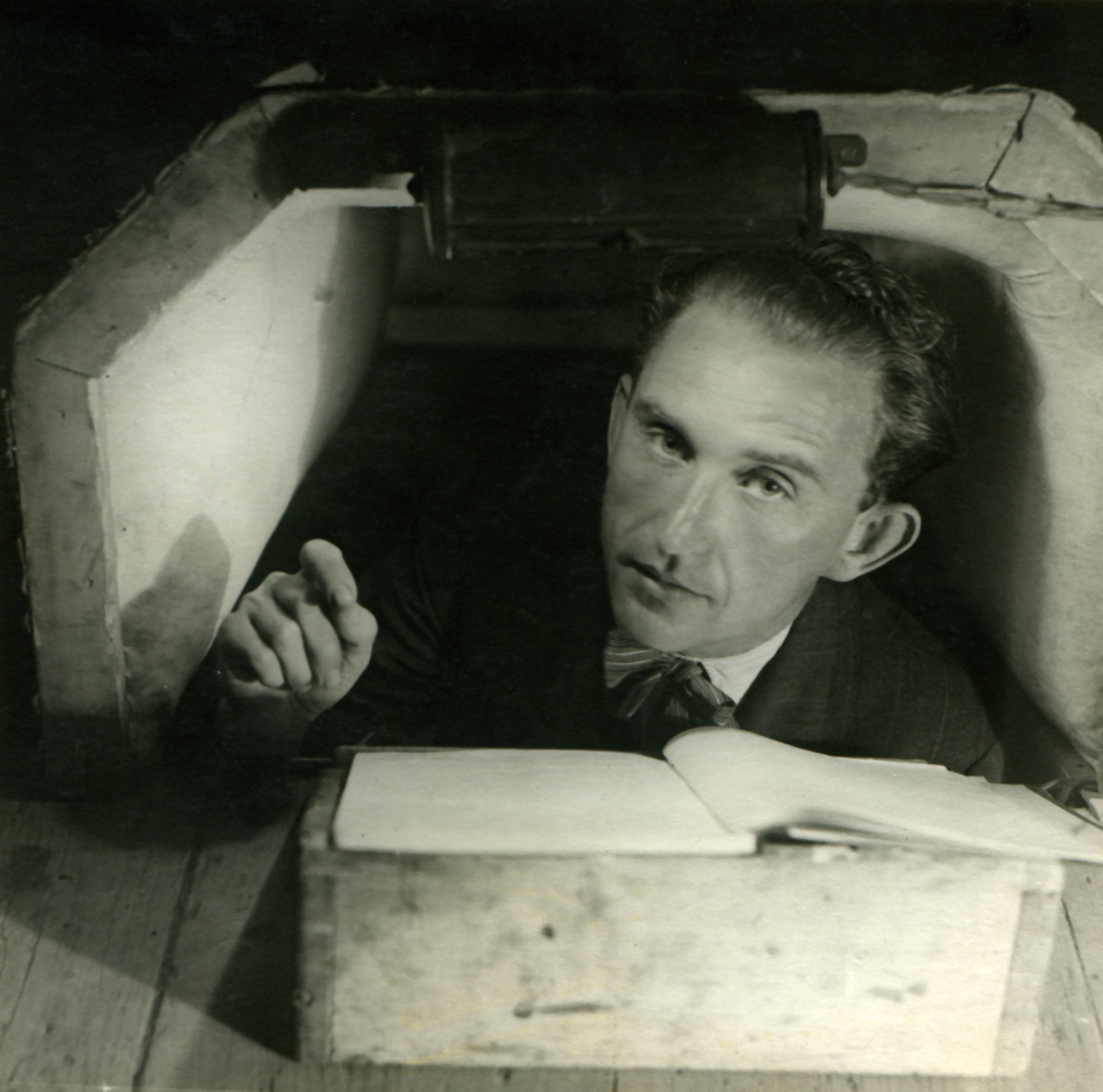
A prompter with his script, 1936

The prompter (sometimes prompt) in a theatre is a person who prompts or cues actors when they forget their lines or neglect to move on the stage to where they are supposed to be situated. The role of the souffleur, or prompter, reaches back to the medieval theatre, but has disappeared in countries like Britain, the United States, France, and Italy. In these places, actors are expected to assist each other in case they forget their lines. However, in Germany and central Europe, the job of the prompter is still very much alive and integral to the repertory system. This is because multiple plays are performed in rotation each week, making it challenging for actors to memorise all their lines.

In theatres without prompters, their role is undertaken by the stage manager, who will have a copy of the script called the prompt book. This is the most definitive version of the script for any one performance, and will contain details of all cues, with their precise timings with respect to the action on stage. This allows the prompt to direct lighting, sound, flying effects and scene changes during a show. The prompt book also often contains blocking notes, so that the prompt is always aware of the intended positions and movements of all the actors on stage at any given time.

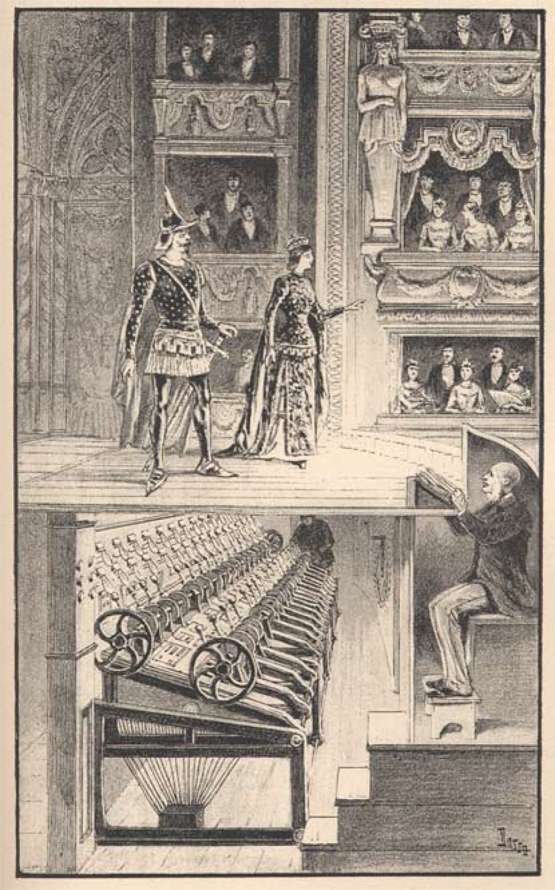
A 19th-century prompter at work.

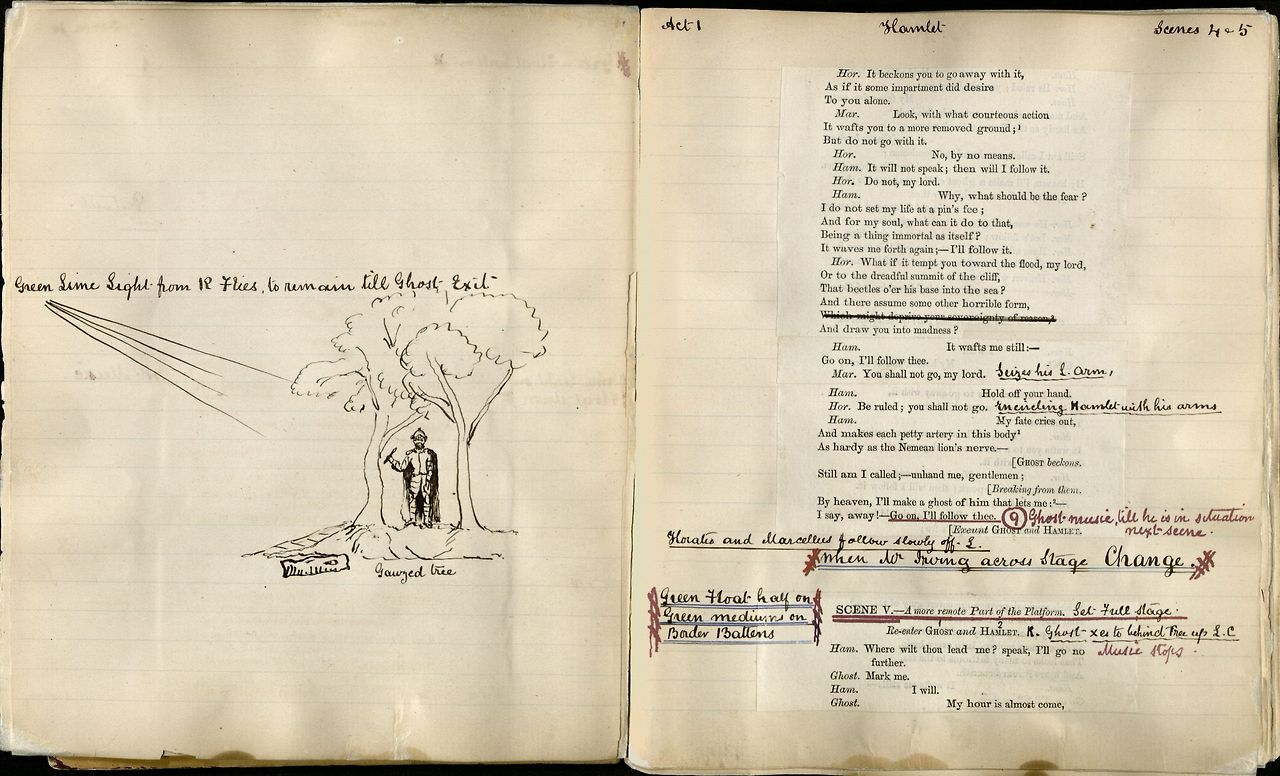
The prompt book from an 1874 staging of Hamlet by English actor and manager Henry Irving (1838–1905), in which he experimented with using limelight (white-hot calcium oxide) to represent the ghost of Hamlet’s father.

In some professional and high-quality community theatre productions, no prompt is used, except during a rehearsal. If prompting is absolutely necessary, it is done very quietly by another actor on-stage or the conductor of the pit orchestra.

The prompt is located on the stage, in the prompt corner or "prompt side".

In Elizabethan theatre the function of prompting was filled by the Book-Holder, who was also in charge of props and calls.

== See also ==
- Cue card girl
- Subtitle

== Sources ==
- Hartnoll, Phyllis; Found, Peter, eds. (1996). The concise Oxford companion to the theatre (2nd ed.). Oxford, UK: Oxford University Press. doi:10.1093/acref/9780192825742.001.0001. ISBN 978-0-19-282574-2.
- Kennedy, Dennis, ed. (26 August 2010). The Oxford Companion to Theatre and Performance. Oxford: Oxford University Press. ISBN 978-0-19-957419-3.
- Oltermann, Philip (26 September 2023). "Meet the secret heroes of German theatre". The Guardian.
- Pavis, Patrice (1998). Dictionary of the Theatre: Terms, Concepts, and Analysis. Translated by Shantz, Christine. Toronto and Buffalo: University of Toronto Press. ISBN 978-0-8020-8163-6.
- Taylor, John Russell (1993). The Penguin Dictionary of the Theatre (3rd ed.). Harmondsworth, UK: Puffin Books. ISBN 978-0-14-051287-8.
