= Coup de glotte =

Articulatory technique in Western Classical singing

Coup de glotte or 'shock of the glottis' is a term used in the theory of singing technique to describe a particular method of emitting or opening a note by an abrupt physical mechanism of the glottis (the space between the vocal folds). It was a term coined by the Spanish baritone and pedagogue, Manuel García II. It was first mentioned in his book, Traité complet de l'art du chant. During the 19th century there was disagreement among teachers and performers as to whether the technique should be taught as a normal part of vocal method or not. The technique is still sometimes used to achieve particular effects, dramatic or ornamental, but is usually avoided in the teaching of fundamental vocal method. In English, it is often called a glottal attack.

== Tone production and vocal 'attack' ==
Vocal sound is produced by a column of air passing from the lungs through the larynx while the vocal cords or ligaments are drawn together, leaving narrow spaces through which the air passes in short, rapid pulsations or vibrations. The discipline of training aims to remove all rigidity and strain in the throat while governing the maximum economy of the ratio of breath to tone produced, so that a relaxed and pure tone may float freely on the breath, supported by the trained and elastic pressure of the diaphragm upon the lungs.

When singing a note, it is desirable that the release of breath and the attack of the tone should occur simultaneously and without artifice. When beginning on a vowel, with no added consonant to mask the start of the note, one can hear if there is any undesirable emission of breath or aspirate (Ha) before the production of tone. If the voice is correctly produced the union of tone and breath should be spontaneous, but if it is not, this fault will apply to every note produced even when the effect is masked by a consonant, and will form a basic (and vocally destructive) flaw in the vocal method.

== Advocacy of coup de glotte ==
The coup de glotte was taught by the renowned Spanish baritone and pedagogue Manuel García as the means of achieving this in normal singing method. García had invented and implemented the laryngoscope, and sought to present scientific explanations for certain functions. He expressed it as follows:

The pupil... should draw in breath slowly, and then produce the sounds by a neat, resolute articulation of the glottis, upon the broad Italian vowel A. If this movement be properly executed, the sound will come out bright and round. Care however must be taken to pitch the sound at once on the note itself, and not to slur up to it, or feel for it. The pupil must also be warned against confounding the articulation or stroke of the glottis with the stroke of the chest, which latter resembles the act of coughing, or the effort made in expelling some obstruction from the throat... The glottis is prepared for articulation by closing it, which causes a momentary accumulation of air below; and it is then opened by a sudden and vigorous stroke, similar to the action of the lips when strongly emphasising the letter P. Some masters recommend the use of [consonants, e.g. Pa, La] in order to acquire precision in striking notes; but in our opinion this plan... has the disadvantage of merely disguising the faulty articulation of the glottis, without possessing any power whatever of correcting it.

In later years during the early twentieth century, discussion continued of the coup de glotte and many believed it could find its place among a singers varied technical repertoire. Teachers and performers such as Reynaldo Hahn believed technical devices, such as the coup de glotte and the portamento, even the manner of breathing, serve only one principle – to achieve an expressive and colorful representation of the music. Though the popularity and use of this technique slowly declined, it still has its place in providing technical and musical expression in passages of music.

== Criticism ==
Much of García's 'method' remains extremely important as a plan for the correct development and production of the voice. But in this respect his 'scientific' approach misfired, and resulted in many students and singers attempting to reproduce the effect described by conscious muscular movement in the throat. This often had injurious results. An essential basis of expressive singing is that the breath and tone should be united without any conscious adjustment of the vocal mechanism, through teaching-methods which direct the singer's attention away from the muscular apparatus by which the sound is produced.

The technique (of 'some masters') referred to by García of vocal exercising rapidly repeating plosive syllables such as 'Pa', transfers the momentary restraint of breath from the larynx or glottis to the lips, so that the natural diaphragmatic attack, without glottal manipulation, is learned. The use of soft vocalised syllables such as 'Ma' or 'Na', in rapid succession on single notes or in vocalises, assist in directing the tone to its 'forward' focus of resonance as the tone remains continuously engaged while the lips of the mouth are intermittently closed and opened and the nasal passages remain unobstructed.

The criticism of the method is expressed, for instance, by Luisa Tetrazzini:

In the result the "attack" is certainly very sharp and clean, but personally I cannot recommend this particular method of achieving that result, since the effect is anything but agreeable to the ear, and there is good reason for thinking that the practice, besides being unnecessary, is also injurious to a vocal organ... There should never be any strain or forcing of any kind, and on the same principle is the rule as to the amount of breath emitted, which should always be the smallest quantity possible which suffices to produce the tone required.

In many other articles and journals shedding the coup de glotte in a negative light continued, and the negative impacts of the overuse of this technique spread to common knowledge in academic fields unrelated to music. In 1912, a journal on speech mentioned the coup de glotte and its current disrepute among voice teachers, as well as its disastrous results.

== A historical debate ==
A very resounding condemnation of the coup de glotte as a singing technique was given by Victor Maurel, in a public lecture at the Lyceum Theatre in July 1892. The debate at that time was strong, and is reported lucidly in several phrases by George Bernard Shaw. The technique was then being advocated by the teacher Charles Lunn (who trained the baritone Frederic Austin) and to an even greater extent by Dr J.W. Bernhardt, in lectures and pamphlets or books on singing method. Shaw noticed the tendency of the technique to produce coarseness in the middle register, and attributed the fault to the García method, and to the teaching of the Royal Academy of Music.

In 1892–93 Shaw and Lunn clashed publicly over the impact of the technique on such singers as Thérèse Tietjens, Mathilde Marchesi, Nellie Melba and Charles Santley. Lunn claimed that the attack on a vowel was impossible without the coup de glotte: Shaw used the example of the organ pipe, or of whistling, to assert the opposite. In the cases of Melba and Santley, at least, the living example left no doubt that this was not an integral part of their vocal method.

On 4 December 1912, Herman Klein, a prominent music critic, teacher and writer, gave a talk on the misunderstood "stroke of the glottis", claiming that Garcias original intent was vastly misinterpreted. Klein emphasized that Garcia's original French term coup was mistranslated as "stroke" or "shock", leading to confusion. Klein believes that rather than a vocal technique, it was merely a physiological description of what he observed through his invention of the laryngoscope. Klein clarified that Garcia never intended this to be a distinct method for producing vocal sound but rather a means to understand the function of the vocal cords.
