= Musico =

Italian term

The Italian term musico (pl.: musici) has a number of meanings:

- Originally, the term referred to any trained, as opposed to amateur, musician.
- In the 18th century, the polite term was used for the voice-type known today as castrato, which was considered a derogatory term at the time. The leading castrato in a company was referred to as a primo musico. A diminutive form (musichetto) was also occasionally used.
- In the 19th century, after the disappearance of castrati from opera, the term referred to a female singer, usually a contralto, who performed male leads in travesti.

== See also ==
- Tenore contraltino
