= Aria di sorbetto =

Short solo by a secondary character

The Aria di sorbetto, or "sorbet aria", was a convention of Italian opera in the early nineteenth century. It comprised a short solo performed by a secondary character in the opera.

== Background ==
Nineteenth-century audiences would rarely listen to an opera straight through, preferring instead to talk among themselves, eat, and drink for much of the performance. The aria di sorbetto would come fairly late in the second act of the opera, and it would afford vendors the chance to hawk their wares one last time before the evening ended. As most of the vendors sold Sorbetto (a Sorbet) and Gelato (an ice cream) and other sweets, such arias came to be known as "sorbet arias" because of what they signified to the audience.

== Conventions ==
The aria di sorbetto was usually given to a secondary character, and was inserted into a scene which had little bearing on the plot of the opera, except tangentially. The character would normally be one who had had no other solo opportunities in the piece. Because the aria was so unimportant, its composition would often be handed off to an inferior composer, one who received no credit for his efforts.

Today, most performances keep the aria di sorbetto intact, rather than cutting it, and audiences are expected to listen to it as they would any other portion of the opera.

== Examples ==
- "Torni alfin ridente" – Gioacchino Rossini, Tancredi, sung by Roggiero
- "Sventurata mi credea" – Rossini, La Cenerentola, sung by Clorinda, composed by Luca Agolini
- "Le femmine d'Italia" – Rossini, L'italiana in Algeri, sung by Haly; this aria is known to not have been composed by Rossini
- "Il vecchiotto cerca moglie" – Rossini, Il Barbiere di Siviglia, sung by the maid Berta
- "Ora mi par che il core" – Rossini, La gazza ladra, sung by Lucia
- "Ah sarebbe troppo dolce" – Rossini, Il turco in Italia, sung by Albazar
