= Tenore contraltino =

Type of tenor voice in Italian opera

The tenore contraltino is a specialized form of the tenor voice found in Italian opera around the beginning of the 19th century, mainly in the Rossini repertoire, which rapidly evolved into the modern 'Romantic' tenor. It is sometimes referred to as tenor altino (or contraltino) in English books.

== Vocal features ==
It is a type of tenor voice with a compass not much wider than that of the coeval baritenor, but able to sustain far higher tessiture. It means that the basic range remained substantially the classic one, from C_{3} to C_{5}: only the best baritenors, however, were able to reach up to such heights and used to pass anyway to the falsettone (or strengthened falsetto) register about G_{4}; for tenori contraltini, on the other hand, the threshold of the passage to the falsettone register rose two or three semitones, and they could so easily reach C_{5} but often up to E_{5}, or even, exceptionally, to F_{5}. The real difference, however, consisted in the tessitura, or the pitch range that most frequently occurs within the given piece of music and where the artist is called upon to execute syllabic singing with the best sound results. The tenore contraltino's required tessiture rose, so that the roles could not be sustained even by the best gifted baritonal tenors. Manuel García, for instance, who had a wide range as a baritenor, "had L'italiana in Algeri in his repertoire, but faced with the extremely high tessitura and the mainly syllabic writing of ‘Languir per una bella’, he transposed the aria down a minor third, performing it in C major instead of E flat".

In France, which was the only European country that had rejected the employment of castrati, a voice type similar to the Italian early-19th-century tenore contraltino had been developing since the 17th century. This voice type was called haute-contre, and the majority of heroic and amatory parts were written for it in grand opera and in opéra-comique. This type reached its apex in the age of Rameau. It was, in fact, a type of tenor voice extremely light and widely ranged, but nearly systematically uttered in falsettone in the high pitch, so as to somehow re-echo the castrato "contraltista" of the Italian stamp. This thesis, evidently borrowed from Rodolfo Celletti’s positions, does not seem to have been fully shared explicitly, in Potter's recent work about the tenor voice. According to him, the main difference between the 18th century Italian tenor (no longer so deep a baritenor, or "tenor-bass", as the seventeenth century one) and the French haute-contre, was that the former would use falsetto (and not falsettone, which Potter never explicitly mentions) above G_{4}, whereas the latter would go up to B flat in full voice or, to be more exact, in a "mixed head and chest voice, and not [in] the full chest voice that Italian tenors would develop later" which is consistent with Celletti and the editor of Grande Enciclopedia’s terminology, in falsettone.

== History ==
Between the end of the eighteenth and the beginning of the nineteenth century, the shortage of castrati among available opera singers compelled coeval composers to contrive substitutes for the roles of "primo musico" in operatic companies. The solution that seemed the most immediate and the most according to tradition, was the so-called "contralto musico", or female singers—usually mezzo-sopranos rather than real contraltos—who could perform the roles originally written for castrati as well as the parts composed with female singers in mind. According to Rodolfo Celletti, in the first 35 years of the 19th century, more than 100 cases of original resort to the "contralto musico" can be counted up, and it was employed also by musicians of the rising post-Rossini generation, such as Donizetti, Mercadante, Pacini and Bellini.

The second possible solution involved the baritonal tenor, but this did not suit the Belcanto-style taste of coeval composers, who shared the traditional dislike for this vocal timbre, as it was considered vulgar at the time. The companies' choices were, as always, limited to the singers available to the various theatres, so this second solution was resorted to when there was no alternative. Rossini, for instance, had recourse to a baritenor as a lover in Elisabetta, regina d'Inghilterra, at a time when his company included two major singers of that type, and also for Torvaldo e Dorliska and Armida, where, beside the amatory protagonist, Rinaldo, created by the very prince of Rossini baritenors, Andrea Nozzari, there appear additionally five or six baritonal tenors in secondary roles.

There were no contraltos available in the mentioned cases, nor was the singer Giovanni David yet, who was to provide Rossini with a third solution: a new type of opera seria tenor voice, springing from the experience of the so-called "half character tenorini", who used to be employed in comic operas and who had clearer and lighter, and therefore more agile, voices than those of the proper baritenors. After still using a basically central and slightly virtuoso writing for the tenor in his early comic operas, Rossini elevated the tenor's tessitura to extremely hard high pitches of virtuosity and coloratura as soon as singers' abilities allowed it. Such was the case of Serafino Gentili, the first performer of Lindoro in L'Italiana in Algeri, of the cited David, the first performer of Don Narciso in Il turco in Italia, of Giacomo Guglielmi, the first performer of Don Ramiro in La Cenerentola and, finally, of Savino Monelli, the first performer of Giannetto in La gazza ladra. When Giovanni David entered Barbaja’s company in Neapolitan theatres, he was entrusted with the young and/or noble lover’s parts, whereas Nozzari and other baritenors got the roles of rancorous or villainous antagonists, or of army leaders. The part of Otello, created by Nozzari, cannot be considered a real amatory role, but "has psychologically the characteristics of the modern baritone, whether he is seen as the heroic general or expresses fury and jealousy".

The above-specified tenore contraltinos were characterized by high, brilliant and acrobatic singing, and could bravely confront baritenors in the hot-blooded challenge duets, as well as finely sing lovers’ elegiac melodies; they were, above all, able to sustain much higher tessiture than those of baritenors themselves. Such tenore contraltino characterization would be slightly attenuated after Rossini's moving to France, where it was possible to resort to the tradition of hautes-contre, who were equally versed in high singing, but rather more averse to castrato virtuosity, typical of Italian opera. Adolphe Nourrit can be regarded as the paragon of this expansion beyond the Alps of the tenor contraltino experience.

The usage of the new type of tenor voice, which includes John Sinclair, the Scottish tenor that first performed Semiramide’s Idreno, passed then into the hands of the other contemporary composers, finding firstly and mainly in Giovanni Battista Rubini, and then also in Gilbert-Louis Duprez and Napoleone Moriani, David’s valid successors. With Rossini, though, a whole era had ended and the new realistic singing ideals of the Romanticism were becoming more widespread. Male coloratura sank into oblivion; Bellini who in La sonnambula still confronted Rubini with virtuosity on a par with the soprano, in I puritani, less than four years later, but would call upon him to sing no more than a scanty number of melismas and Donizetti, who would always keep employing coloratura in the parts written for Rubini, would interrupt this usage with Duprez when the latter ceased posing as the former’s emulator. On the other hand, the falsettone register began, as well, to go out of fashion quite rapidly, as a simple recollection of Baroque antirealism times of yore: Rubini would raise up to high B♭ the uttering of force (or forceful), improperly called "from the chest"; Duprez, in his turn, would have Lucca’s audience hear the first high "C from the chest" and would then give up elegiac singing of his former model Rubini, beginning to utter forcefully the whole high note range and also taking on many manners of baritenors, who were then still haunting the operatic scenes (dark timbre, firm accent, great phrasing nobility, quivering and passionate acting). The great Adolphe Nourrit, having proved himself unable to conform to the new singing and taste trend, having been overcome by Duprez at the Opéra through a forceful performance of Arnold’s role in William Tell, which he himself had created, according to Rossini's expectations, by hautes-contre’s ancient graceful singing, ended his days in despair in Naples where he had resumed his studies with Donizetti, falling headlong from the window of a hotel's room. The brief season of the tenore contraltino was over and there had begun the new era of the Romantic tenor, whether it was called lyric or dramatic, elegiac or spinto, robusto or di grazia, which is still enduring till present times.

== Sources ==
- Marco Beghelli and Nicola Gallino (ed), Tutti i libretti di Rossini, Garzanti, Milan, 1991, ISBN 88-11-41059-2
- Rodolfo Celletti, Storia del belcanto, Discanto Edizioni, Fiesole, 1983
- Salvatore Caruselli (ed), Grande enciclopedia della musica lirica, Longanesi &C. Periodici S.p.A., Rome, vol 4
- The New Grove Dictionary of Opera, edited by Stanley Sadie (1992), ISBN 0-333-73432-7 and ISBN 1-56159-228-5
- John Potter, Tenor, History of a voice, Yale University Press, New Haven and London, 2009, ISBN 978-0-300-11873-5
- This article is a substantial translation from Tenore contraltino in the Italian Wikipedia.
