= Rage aria =

Operatic aria expressing rage

A rage aria is an operatic aria expressing the rage of the character performing it.

Normally in da capo form, such arias emerged during the Baroque period and are typically found in opera seria. Rage arias were known by various terms in Italian, including aria di strepito, aria agitata and aria infuriata. Typically, they display the musical characteristics of quick tempos and fast runs, and are short in length. Such arias have been written by, amongst other composers, George Frideric Handel in the Baroque period and Wolfgang Amadeus Mozart in the Classical period.

== History ==
According to the doctrine of the affections, a theory of aesthetics that dictates emotions based on outward visible and auditory signs, each aria in an opera must have a single emotion. According to the philosophy of affects, complex musical gestures are more easily suited to the emotions of hatred, retaliation, and fury than to those of gentle affects. Rage arias were amongst various types of aria which were employed in 18th century opera, including the more restrained aria di sentimento, the aria di lamento (lament), and the showy aria di bravura. One of the best-known examples of the genre is the Queen of the Night's "Der Hölle Rache kocht in meinem Herzen", from Die Zauberflöte. Others include "No, no, I'll take no less", from Handel's Semele, "I am the wife of Mao Tse-Tung" from John Adams' Nixon in China, "D'Oreste, d'Ajace" in Mozart's Idomeneo.

== See also ==
- Mad scene
