= Duodrama =

Type of melodrama for two performers

A duodrama is a theatrical melodrama for two actors or singers, in which the spoken voice is used with a musical accompaniment for heightened dramatic effect. It was popular at the end of the 18th century and the beginning of the 19th.

Closely related to opera, the most famous example were the 1775 works Ariadne auf Naxos and Medea by Georg Benda. Mozart admired Benda's work and used similar techniques in Zaide (1780) and Thamos, König in Ägypten (c. 1773-1780). He considered writing a duodrama himself, to be called Semiramis. Beethoven's Fidelio (1805-1814) and Carl Maria von Weber's Der Freischütz (1821) also contain duodramas. The style is also used in lieder and song.

== See also ==
- Monodrama
- Melodrama
