= Falsettone =

Vocal technique in opera

Falsettone is a term used in modern Italian musicology to describe a vocal technique used by male opera singers in the past, in which the fluty sounds typical of falsetto singing are amplified by using the same singing technique used in the modal voice register. The result is a bright, powerful tone, often very high-pitched, although the sound is still different from and more feminine than what is produced by the modal voice. The term falsettone is also used for the mixed vocal register that can be achieved using this technique.

== History and description ==
Falsettone has reportedly been used by tenors, baritenors, hautes-contre, and tenori contraltini of the Baroque and Classical eras. It was used from about A4 or B♭4 upwards.

According to various authors, baroque and neoclassical tenors simply used falsetto to sing high notes, with the exception of hautes-contre, who could reach up to B♭ in what was claimed to be the modal voice register. However, it was actually a "mixed head and chest voice, and not the full chest voice that Italian tenors would develop later". (Here, "head voice" refers to falsetto and "chest voice" refers to modal voice.)

Nowadays, the falsettone register is seldom used in Opera. Such notes as high C, C-sharp, D and E♭ are usually sung in the modal or modal sounding "mixed voice" register (or, as it is sometimes misleadingly described, "from the chest"). Even the famous F5 of Bellini’s I Puritani, which used to be left out or sung falsetto (for example by Luciano Pavarotti) has often been performed with a more "chesty" voice by the new bel canto tenor generation of the late 20th century.. It's unclear whether this mode of execution of notes as high as F5 and around is actually modal or, or the same light registration of falsettone but with more compression twang and brighter vowels which make it sound like a prosecution of modal.

Falsettone is however employed in many renditions of classical baroque music, of which Monteverdi, Handel are names worth of mention, pioneers of this genre, by male singers, tenors but often even baritones or lower, taking roles which used to be of castrati. These singers use a resonating falsetto to achieve the notes and approximate the timbre which possibly used to be of these men. We can name among them Andreas Scholl, Philippe Jaroussky. Female opera singers often use this register for the higher part of their tessitura, but they connect it to their lower register.

In that same period Italian musicologist Rodolfo Celletti, who was also an amateur singing teacher, tried to restore the falsettone technique, training the tenor Giuseppe Morino, who made his debut singing the tenore contraltino role of Gualtiero in Bellini’s Il pirata, at the Festival della Valle d'Itria in Martina Franca.

== Style of falsettone ==
Whether falsettone is a range or style is often questioned. In the definition of falsettone, laryngeal and stylistic aspects overlap. Falsettone features a sound color that is relatively dark, "covered", pure, rounded and consistent. Falsettone is thought to use a stronger level of adduction and support than the typical falsetto. It is often debated whether or not to apply this definition to any sound. Even the ones most similar to the modal sound possibly made in M2, especially in the higher section of the voice. "Reinforced falsetto" is also used interchangeably, but more frequently, to describe strategies which intend to enrich and swell emissions which might be M2 or "falsetto" in nature.

== Sources ==
- Rodolfo Celletti, A History of Bel Canto, Oxford University Press, 1996, ISBN 0-19-816641-9 (quotations from the Italian edition: Storia del belcanto, Discanto Edizioni, Fiesole, 1983)
- Salvatore Caruselli (ed), Grande enciclopedia della musica lirica, Longanesi &C. Periodici S.p.A., Rome, vol 4 (in Italian)
- John Potter, Tenor, History of a voice, Yale University Press, New Haven and London, 2009, ISBN 978-0-300-11873-5
- Stanley Sadie (ed.), The New Grove Dictionary of Opera, Oxford University Press, New York, 1992, 4 volumes, ISBN 978-0-19-522186-2
