= Mad scene =

Conventional scene depicting madness in opera

A mad scene (French: scène de folie, Italian: scena della pazzia, or German: Wahnsinnsszene) is a depiction of insanity in opera, theater, or other forms. It may occupy a discrete number, appear or recur in through-composed music, anchor a finale, or constitute the entire work. Mad scenes are often dramatic virtuoso pieces for opera singers, sometimes specific singers.

== History ==
The mad scene likely first appeared in 17-century Venetian opera with Cavalli's La Didone and, for male inamorato, in L'Egisto. In 18th-century Italian opera, especially opera seria or opera semiseria, examples are found in Handel's Orlando and, farcically, Imeneo.

In early Romantic music, the convention was popularized in French and especially Italian bel canto opera. Likely modeled on Bellini's I puritani, Donizetti's Lucia di Lammermoor is the most famous example. Gilbert and Sullivan satirized it via Mad Meg in Ruddigore. As verismo pushed toward artistic realism, composers integrated mad scenes more organically. In Romantic music, Tchaikovsky often deployed them as finales. Meanwhile, ballet had its own landmark: Adam's Giselle.

Amid scientific advances in psychiatry, many modernist composers revived and transformed the form in expressionist music, including operas, melodramas, and monodramas. In early 20th-century classical music, Strauss's Salome and Elektra, Schoenberg's Pierrot lunaire and Erwartung, and Berg's Wozzeck and Lulu depicted madness in new, dissonant idioms. Berg, Stravinsky (The Rake's Progress), and Britten (Peter Grimes) wrote such scenes for male roles. Britten also wrote a mad scene parody for A Midsummer Night's Dream. After Pierrot, Davies' Eight Songs for a Mad King further extended the form into modernist music theatre.

Musical theatre more generally drew on the tradition, as in Lloyd Webber's Sunset Boulevard and Sondheim's Sweeney Todd. In Porter's Kiss Me, Kate (written 1947–1948), the act 1 finale ("Kiss Me") parodies Lucia's mad scene as Kate's forced kiss sparks an angry cadenza on "never". When Jarmila Novotná declined the role, Pole created the moment for Lucia star Lily Pons, who also declined.

== Selected examples ==
=== Baroque ===
Francesco Cavalli

- La Didone, Act 2
- L'Egisto, Act 3
- Giasone

Alessandro Stradella

- Il Trespolo tutore

Jean-Baptiste Lully

- Roland, Act 4, Scene 5, "Je suis trahi! Ciel!"

George Frideric Handel

- Orlando, "Ah! stigie larve... Vaghe pupille"
- Hercules, "Where shall I fly?"

Johann Adolph Hasse

- Artaserse, "Pallido il sole"

=== Classical ===
Wolfgang Amadeus Mozart

- Idomeneo, "D'Oreste, d'Ajace"

Ferdinando Paer

- Agnese

=== Romantic ===
Gioachino Rossini

- Ermione, "Essa corre al trionfo"
- Semiramide, "Deh! Ti ferma"

Gaetano Donizetti

- Lucia di Lammermoor, "Il dolce suono... Ardon gl'incensi... Spargi d'amaro pianto", the locus classicus
- Linda di Chamounix, "Linda! Ah che pensato"
- Maria Padilla
- Torquato Tasso
- Anna Bolena, "Piangete voi... Al dolce guidami... Coppia iniqua"

Vincenzo Bellini

- I puritani, "O rendetemi... Qui la voce sua soave... Vien, diletto, e in ciel la luna"
- Il pirata, "Col sorriso d'innocenza... Oh, Sole! ti vela di tenebra fonda"
- La sonnambula, "Oh! se una volta sola... Ah! non credea mirarti... Ah! non giunge uman pensiero"

Giuseppe Verdi

- Nabucco, "Chi mi toglie"
- Macbeth, "Una macchia"
- Attila, "Mentre gonfiarsi l'anima"

Richard Wagner

- Die Feen, Act 3, "Halloh! Halloh! Lasst alle Hunde los!"
- Tristan und Isolde

Giacomo Meyerbeer

- L'étoile du nord, Act 3
- Dinorah (originally Le Pardon de Ploërmel), "Ombre légère"

Ferenc Erkel

- Bánk bán, Act 3, "Tudsz-e madárról éneket?"

Ambroise Thomas

- Hamlet, "Partagez-vous mes fleurs"

Johannes Brahms

- Ophelia–Lieder, setting Ophelia's words from the mad scene of Shakespeare's Hamlet

Modest Mussorgsky

- Boris Godunov, "Oi! Duschno, Duschno"

Pyotr Ilyich Tchaikovsky

- The Oprichnik, finale
- Mazeppa, finale
- The Enchantress, finale

Nikolai Rimsky-Korsakov

- The Tsar's Bride, "Ivan Sergeyich, khochesh' v sad poydem"

=== Since 1900 ===
Richard Strauss

- Salome, finale
- Elektra, finale

Arnold Schoenberg

- Erwartung, in toto

Max von Schillings

- Mona Lisa, Act 2, "So! so! Hab' ich dich!"

Alban Berg

- Wozzeck, Act 1, Scene 2, "Du [Andres], der Platz ist verflucht!" (Note: "You [Andres], this place is cursed!")
- Wozzeck, Act 3, Scene 4, "Das Messer! Wo ist das Messer?" (Note: "The knife! Where is the knife?")
- Lulu, Act 2, Scene 1, "Du Kreatur, die mich durch den Strassenkot zum Martertode schleift!" (Dr. Schön's five-strophe aria)

Sergei Prokofiev

- Semyon Kotko

Benjamin Britten

- Peter Grimes, "Steady. There you are, nearly home"
- Curlew River

Igor Stravinsky

- The Rake's Progress

Francis Poulenc

- Dialogues des Carmélites
- La voix humaine

Hans Werner Henze

- Elegy for Young Lovers

Peter Maxwell Davies

- Eight Songs for a Mad King

Leonard Bernstein

- Mass, XVI. Fraction: "Things get broken"

Dominick Argento

- Miss Havisham's Fire, finale

John Corigliano

- The Ghosts of Versailles, "They are always with me"

André Previn

- A Streetcar Named Desire

=== Since 2000 ===
Daniel Catán

- Salsipuedes: a Tale of Love, War and Anchovies (2004), Act 3, Scene 3, "Guzmán, Guzmán, ayúdame" (General García)

== Comparable examples ==
Francesco Sacrati

- La finta pazza, Act 2, Scene 10 (Deidamia)

Henry Purcell

- "From rosy bow'rs" from The Comical History of Don Quixote, described by Edward Joseph Dent as a "mad song"

Jean-Philippe Rameau

- Platée, Air de la Folie

Giuseppe Verdi

- La traviata, "É strano! ... Sempre libera"

Arnold Schoenberg

- Pierrot lunaire

Giacomo Puccini

- Suor Angelica, arguably in toto

Milton Babbitt

- Philomel

Luciano Berio

- Sequenza III

Olga Neuwirth

- Lost Highway, Scene 5.4, "There's no smoking here"

Michael Finnissy

- Gesualdo: Libro Sesto, IV. "Quel 'no' crudel"

=== Parodies ===
Jacques Offenbach

- Le pont des soupirs, "Ah! le Doge, ah! Les plombs, le canal Orfano l'Adriatique, c'est fini je suis folle"

Gilbert and Sullivan

- Ruddigore, "Cheerily carols the lark"
- The Grand Duke, "I have a rival! Frenzy-thrilled, I find you both together!"

Benjamin Britten

- A Midsummer Night's Dream, the Pyramus and Thisbe scene

Leonard Bernstein

- Candide, "Glitter and be gay"

== See also ==
- Female hysteria
- Hysteria
- Jean-Martin Charcot
- Pitié-Salpêtrière Hospital
- Rage aria
