= Pappano's Essential Ring Cycle =

Pappano's Essential Ring Cycle is a British television documentary first aired on BBC Four in 2013 presented by the Italian conductor Antonio Pappano about the German composer Richard Wagner and his tetralogical opera The Ring Cycle, also called by the formal title of Ring of the Niebelung. In 90 minutes he covers all 4 operas consisting of Wagner's Ring Cycle with scenes taken from his productions of the operas.

Included in the programme are interviews with opera singers, notably John Tomlinson who has sung the principal character Wotan numerous times. Under Pappano he has sung the Götterdämmerung antagonist, Hagen.

Pappano visits Bayreuth and the palace of Wagner's patron Ludwig II of Bavaria during the documentary. Pappano explains how Wagner did not approve of the word opera to describe his compositions. Instead he favoured the term musical drama, which he considered to be an all-inclusive term for his role of controlling every aspect of the production.

Pappano relates how Wagner would stand on the stage, directing the singers, including singing all the roles, male and female to them; as means to direct them in interpreting roles. Wagner would also show stage choreography to the cast by performing stage fighting and demonstrating how to climb mountains, when scenes required mountaineering skills to scale scenography.

Also noteworthy within the programme is Pappano filming the interior of Ludwig II's palace revealing the neo-gothic and richly coloured interior design alongside panoramic paintings of scenes from Wagner's Ring Cycle. The palace of Richard Wagner's patron is usually ignored in documentaries in favour if focusing exclusively on the Bayreuth opera house.

Pappano returned to conducting the Ring for the Royal Opera House, London in October 2012.
