= Blocking (stage) =

Precise positioning of actors on a stage

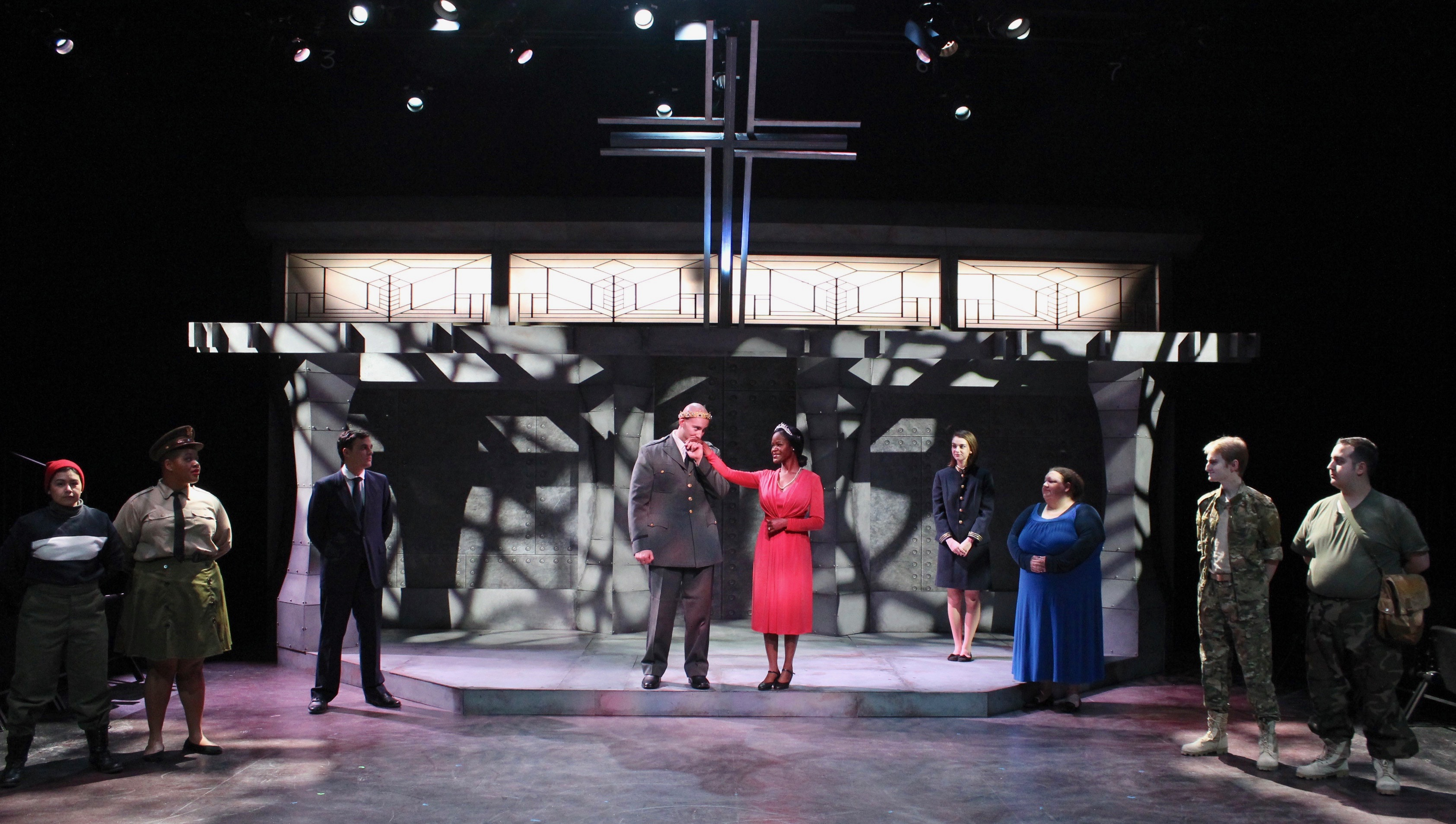
Actors positioned on stage in a production of Macbeth

In theatre, blocking is the precise arrangement of actors to facilitate the performance of a play, ballet, film or opera. Historically, the expectations of staging/blocking have changed substantially over time in Western theatre. Prior to the movements toward realism that occurred in the 19th century, most staging used a tableau approach, in which a stage picture was established whenever characters entered or left the stage. This ensured that leading performers were shown to their best advantage. In more recent times, while nothing is different about showing leading performers to their best advantage, there have been changing cultural expectations that have made blocking/staging more complicated.

There are also artistic reasons why blocking can be crucial. Through careful use of positioning on the stage, a director or performer can establish or change the significance of a scene. Different artistic principles can inform blocking, including minimalism and naturalism.

== Etymology ==
Both "blocking" and "block" were applied to stage and theatre from as early as 1961. The term derives from the practice of 19th-century theatre directors such as Sir W. S. Gilbert who worked out the staging of a scene on a miniature stage using a block to represent each of the actors. Gilbert's practice is depicted in Mike Leigh's 1999 film Topsy-Turvy.

== Blocking in theatre and film ==
In contemporary theatre, the director usually determines blocking during rehearsal, telling actors where they should move for the proper dramatic effect, to ensure sight lines for the audience and to work with the lighting design of the scene.

Each scene in a play is normally "blocked" as a unit, after which the director will move on to the next scene. The positioning of actors on stage in one scene will usually affect the possibilities for subsequent positioning unless the stage is cleared between scenes.

During the blocking rehearsal, the assistant director, stage manager or director takes notes about where actors are positioned and their movements on stage. It is especially important for the stage manager to note the actors' positions, as a director is not usually present for each performance, and it becomes the stage manager's job to ensure that actors follow the assigned blocking from night to night.

In film, the term is sometimes used to speak of the arrangement of actors in the frame. In this context, there is also a need to consider the movement of the camera as part of the blocking process.

== Stage directions ==
House left and right are from the audience's perspective.

The stage itself has been given named areas to facilitate blocking.

- The rear of the stage area, furthest from the audience, is upstage. The front, nearest the audience, is downstage. The terms derive from the once common use of raked stages that slope downward toward the audience.
- In English-speaking cultures generally, stage left and stage right refer to the actors' left and right when facing the audience. The terms prompt and bastard/opposite prompt are sometimes used as synonyms. (See also Prompt corner)
- House left and house right refer to the audience perspective. In productions for film or video, analogous terms are screen left/right and camera left/right.
- To cross is to move. An actor placed up-stage right in blocking may be instructed by a director to cross down-stage left when speaking a line.

=== Non-English-speaking cultures ===
==== French ====
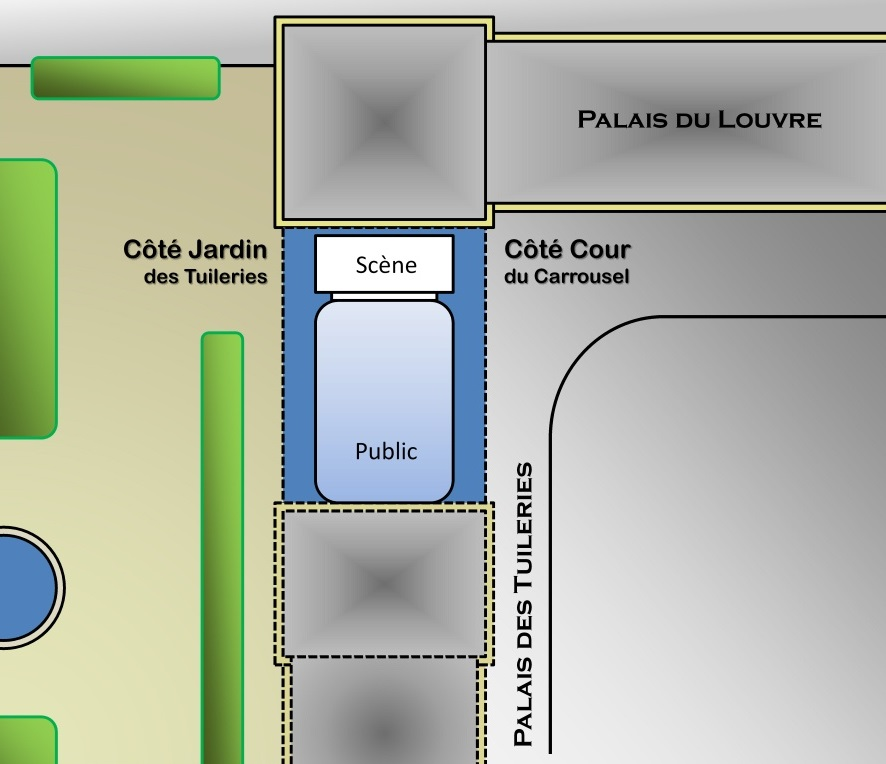
Map of the Théâtre des Tuileries

In French, house right is côté cour (courtyard side) and house left is côté jardin (garden side). The history of the term goes back to the Comédie-Française, where since 1770, the troupe performed in the Théâtre des Tuileries in the former Tuileries Palace: the venue had the Louvre courtyard on one side, and the Tuileries Garden on the other side.

Before that time, the house right was called "côté de la reine" (Queen side), and the house left "côté du roi" (King side), because of the respective positions of the Queen and King galleries. This designation was abandoned after the French Revolution.

==== Cantonese opera ====
In Cantonese opera, stage right is called yi bin (the side of clothing) and stage left is zaap bin (the side of props).

==== Other languages ====
In German, Italian and Arabic, left and right always refer to the audience perspective.
