= This Is Opera =

Documentary series about opera

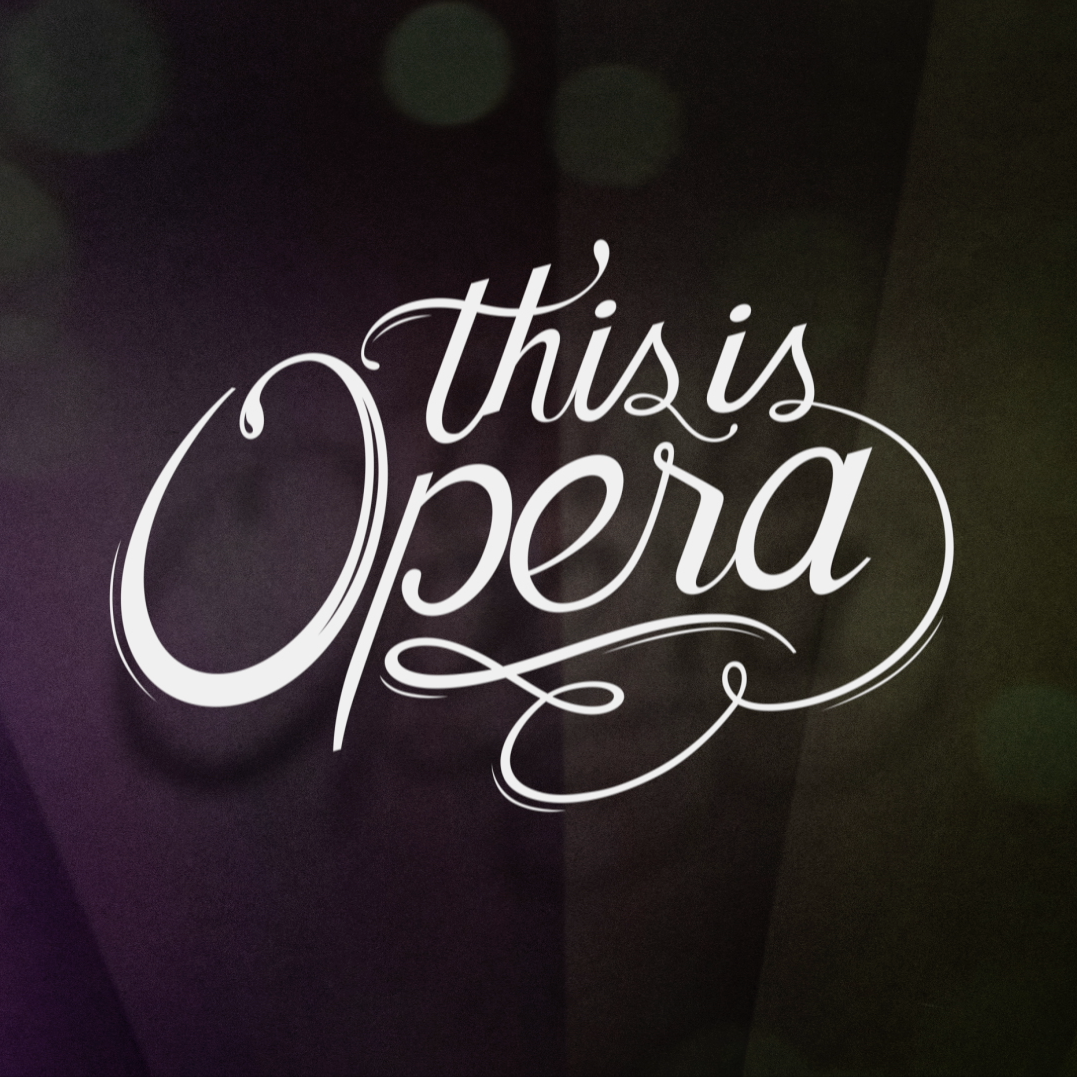
- Genre: Documentary television series
- Directed by: Ramon Gener
- Starring: Ramon Gener
- Country of origin: Spain
- Original languages: English; Spanish
- No. of seasons: 2
- No. of episodes: 30

Production
- Executive producer: Raimon Masllorens
- Producers: Nèlida Sánchez; Arlette Peyret
- Running time: 45-50 minutes (without commercials)
- Production company: Brutal Media

Original release
- Network: La 2
- Release: 8 March – 27 December 2015

This Is Opera is a Spanish television documentary series created and directed by Ramon Gener. The show explores opera in unconventional ways to try to attract not just existing opera fans, but also those less familiar with the art form. The host guides the viewer to the places of origin of each opera, and explores the culture, history—and modern and current trends and how they apply to opera.

The show premiered on Servus TV in Austria and Germany on 17 January 2015, on La 2 in Spain on 8 March 2015, on RAI 5 in Italy on 15 May 2015, and on 19 August 2015, on Foxtel Arts in Australia.

== Reception ==
The program and its host have garnered a viewership that includes those uninterested in opera, allowing the show to reach a wide audience, while also attracting those already in music circles.

The series has received nominations from festivals: This Is Opera was nominated in the Rocky Awards in the BANFF festival under the category of music and variety. It was also chosen for the IDFA festival in November 2015. Most recently, it has been nominated at the Rose d'Or Festival in the category of Arts for its episode of Turandot.

== Host ==
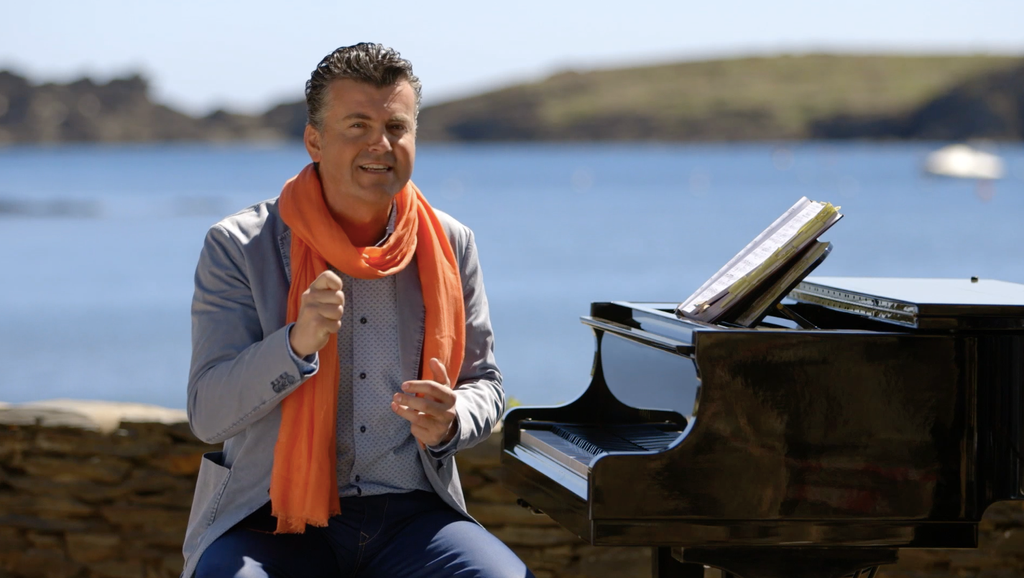
From episode Tristan und Isolde

Ramon Gener, writer and musician, is the host. With the dramatic aspect of opera, Gener tries to transmit ideas or thoughts on life—for example the idea of sharing, which he states in an interview, "All that you have, share it with the world for if you don't what use is it in having?" He has hosted other shows, and has been involved in Television programs since early 2011.

Gener has done various interviews concerning his writings, and This is Opera in which he discusses his first experiences with music and how the show came to be.

== Season 1 ==
No. overall	No. in season	Title	Written by
1	1	"Carmen"	Pep Bras; Ramon Gener
2	2	"Turandot"	Gemma Sanz; Ramon Gener
3	3	"The Barber of Seville"	Eloi Vila; Ramon Gener
4	4	"La bohème"	Gemma Sanz; Ramon Gener
5	5	"Parsifal"	Albert Travesset; Ramon Gener
6	6	"Pelléas et Mélisande"	Eloi Vila; Ramon Gener
7	7	"Bel Canto"	Eloi Vila; Ramon Gener
8	8	"Der Ring des Nibelungen"	Eloi Vila; Ramon Gener
9	9	"Tosca"	Gemma Sanz; Ramon Gener
10	10	"La traviata"	Gemma Sanz; Ramon Gener
11	11	"Tristan und Isolde"	Eloi Vila; Ramon Gener
12	12	"Don Giovanni"	Pep Bras; Ramon Gener
13	13	"Rigoletto"	Eloi Vila; Ramon Gener
14	14	"Manon"	Pep Bras; Ramon Gener
15	15	"The Free Shooter"	Gemma Sanz; Ramon Gener

== Season 2 ==
No. overall	No. in season	Title	Written by
16	1	"Pagliacci"	Eloi Vila; Ramon Gener
17	2	"Eugene Onegin"	Eloi Vila; Ramon Gener
18	3	"Fidelio"	Eloi Vila; Ramon Gener
19	4	"Handel"	Gemma Sanz; Ramon Gener
20	5	"Così fan tutte"	Eloi Vila; Ramon Gener
21	6	"Salome"	Gemma Sanz; Ramon Gener
22	7	"Nabucco"	Gemma Sanz; Ramon Gener
23	8	"Der Rosenkavalier"	Gemma Sanz; Ramon Gener
24	9	"The Magic Flute"	Eloi Vila; Ramon Gener
25	10	"Vivaldi and Venice"	Pep Bras; Ramon Gener
26	11	"Lulu"	Gemma Sanz; Ramon Gener
27	12	"Madama Butterfly"	Gemma Sanz; Ramon Gener
28	13	"Rusalka"	Gemma Sanz; Ramon Gener
29	14	"The Birth of Opera"	Eloi Vila; Ramon Gener
30	15	"Opera is Life"	Ramon Gener
