= Stage management =

Theatre or event coordination and organization

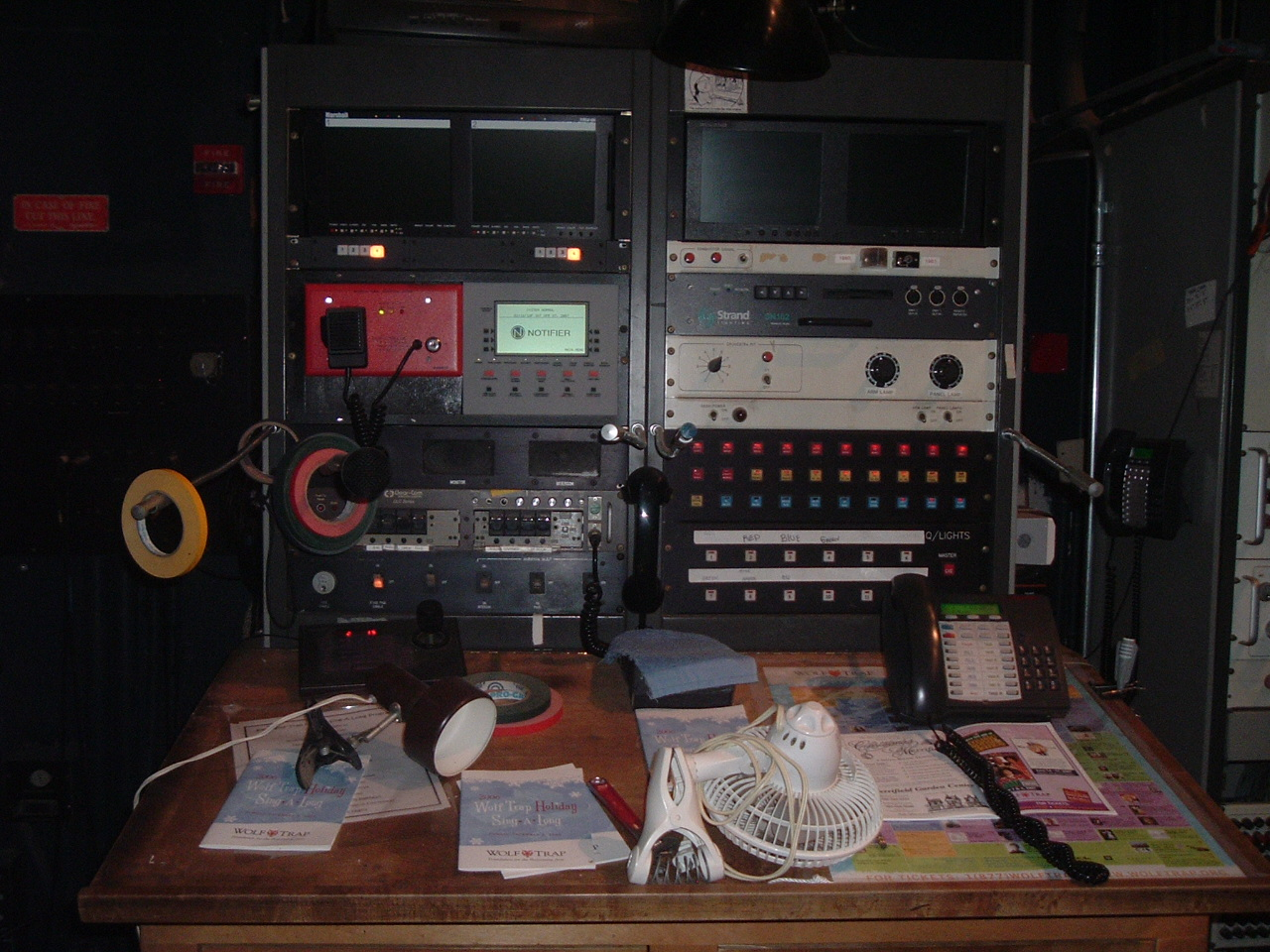
Part of a stage manager's panel, or "prompt corner"

Stage management is a broad field that is generally defined as the practice of organization and coordination of an event or theatrical production. Stage management may encompass a variety of activities including oversight of the rehearsal process and coordinating communications among various production teams and personnel. Stage management requires a general understanding of all aspects of production and provides complete organization to ensure the process runs smoothly and efficiently.

A stage manager is an individual who has overall responsibility for stage management and the smooth execution of a theatrical production. Stage management may be performed by an individual in small productions, while larger productions typically employ a stage management team consisting of a head stage manager, or production stage manager, and one or more assistant stage managers.

== History ==
A modern purpose-built stage manager's panel

The title of stage manager was not used until the 18th century, though the concept and need for someone to fill the area of stage management can be seen with the Ancient Greeks. The playwrights were usually responsible for production elements. Sophocles is the first known stage technician, supported by his employment as a scenic artist, playwright, musician, and producer.

In the Middle Ages, there is evidence of a conducteur de secrets, who oversaw collecting money at the door and serving as a prompter on stage. The prompter held the script and was prepared to feed performers their lines; this was a common practice of the time.

Between the Renaissance and 17th century, the actors and playwrights handled stage management aspects and stage crew. In the Elizabethan and Jacobean theatre there were two roles that covered stage management: stage keeper and bookkeeper. The stage keeper was responsible for the maintenance of the theater, taking props on and off stage, and security of performance space. The bookkeeper was responsible for the stage script, obtaining necessary licenses, copying/providing lines for the performers, marking entrances and exits, tracking props, marking when sound effects come in, and cueing props and sound effects.

Between the Renaissance and the 16th century, actors and playwrights took upon themselves the handling of finances, general directorial duties, and stage management. Stage management first emerged as a distinct role in the 17th century during Shakespeare's and Molière's time. During Shakespeare’s time the roles of stage management were left to apprentices, young boys learning the trade. There is still evidence of a prompter at this time.

It was not until the 18th century in England that the term stage manager was used. This was the first time a person other than actors and playwright was hired to direct or manage the stage. Over time, with the rise in complexity of theatre due to advances such as mechanized scenery, quick costume changes, and controlled lighting, the stage manager's job was split into two positions— director and stage manager.

The professionalization of stage management accelerated in the early 20th century. Scholar Brander Matthews described the stage manager as "the absolute ruler of the stage, highlighting the role's central authority in production. By the mid-century, theatre management practices were systematically analyzed, further codifying the stage manager's responsibilities in areas such as scheduling, budgeting, and personnel coordination within professional theatre organizations.

Many playwrights, directors, and actors have previously worked as assistant stage managers. Writer and director Preston Sturges, for example, was employed as an ASM on Isadora Duncan's production of Oedipus Rex at the age of 16 and a half:

When one is responsible for giving an offstage cue, even the simplest ones, like the ring of a telephone or a birdcall, demand considerable sangfroid, and the job is nerve-wracking. One is very much aware that everything depends on the delivery of the cue at exactly the right microsecond. One stands there, knees slightly bent, breathing heavily...

Sturges didn't last long in this job, due to his calling for thunder and then lightning instead of lightning and then thunder, but 16 years later Brock Pemberton hired him as an ASM on Antoinette Perry's production of Goin' Home, which led to the first mounting of one of Sturges' plays on Broadway, The Guinea Pig, in 1929.

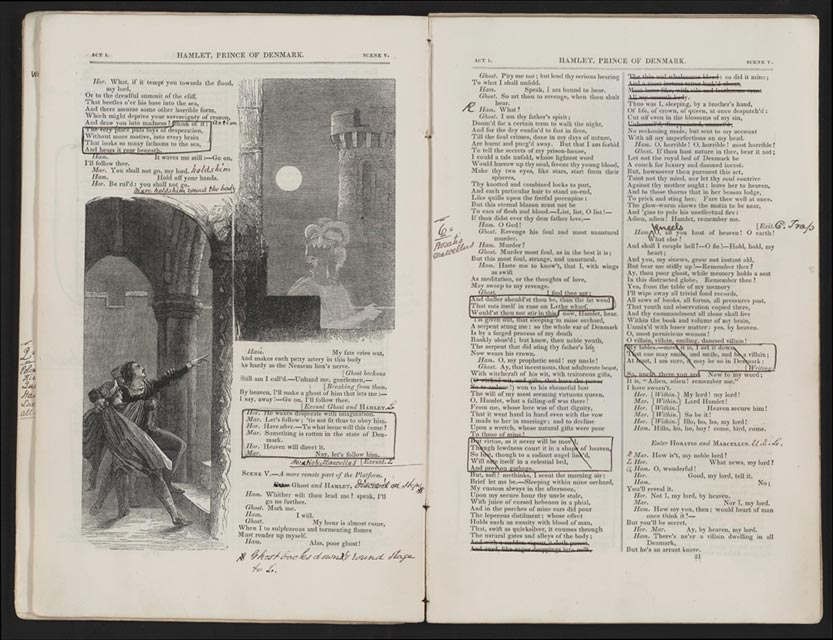
Page from American actress Charlotte Cushman's prompt-book for Shakespeare's Hamlet at the Washington Theater in 1861

== Regional differences ==
=== United States ===
In the United States, stage manager is a generic title that may be applied to anyone who performs stage management functions. On small shows, one person typically performs all the tasks of stage management, and is simply referred to as the stage manager. Larger shows often need two or more stage managers. In such cases the head stage manager is titled production stage manager (commonly abbreviated PSM), and working under the PSM is one or more assistant stage managers (commonly abbreviated ASM). Shows that employ three stage managers have a PSM and two ASMs, though the program credits may list them as production stage manager (first or head stage manager), stage manager (second stage manager), and assistant stage manager (third stage manager).

Some professional stage managers on plays and musicals may choose to be represented by a union known as the Actors' Equity Association, which also represents performers. In addition to performing their typical stage management duties (e.g., maintaining the prompt book and calling performances), Equity stage managers are also required to uphold the union's rules and rights for Equity artists. Union stage managers for opera, ballet, and modern dance are represented by the American Guild of Musical Artists and perform most of the same duties as their counterparts in plays and musicals. The American Guild of Variety Artists also represents variety performers, dancers and stage managers. Any show that is employing members of these unions must hire at least one stage manager that is also a member of that union.

=== United Kingdom ===
In the UK, the structure of a stage management team depends on the type and size of the production. It can consist of stage manager (overseeing the running of the show), deputy stage manager (commonly called DSM), and assistant stage manager (commonly called ASM). A fringe theatre show may employ one stage manager to carry out the tasks of an entire team, whereas a West End theatre show in London might employ multiple ASMs. Professional stage managers are represented by the British Actors' Equity Association, which also represents performers.

==== Deputy stage manager ====
The DSM prompts actors and will usually cue technical crew members and sometimes cast, while following the orders of the director and stage manager. The DSM calls actors to hold while technical problems are sorted out during rehearsal, and determines where in the script to restart halted scenes. The deputy stage manager (DSM) is a separate position in some theatres, while in others the responsibilities of the DSM may be assumed by the stage manager or assistant stage manager.

==== Assistant stage manager ====
The assistant stage manager (ASM) has varied responsibilities, which are assigned by the stage manager. The ASM assists in finding and maintaining props during rehearsals and the run of the show. The ASM may take attendance or estimate audience size, may manage the backstage technicians, may act as a liaison between crew, cast and management, and may call some cues. Mundane tasks such as mopping the stage and brewing coffee or tea may fall to the ASM. If the stage manager is unable to perform his or her duties, the ASM must be able to fill in. The assistant may also be in charge of one wing of the stage, while the stage manager is on the other wing.

=== South Korea ===
Due to the recent global rise in popularity of K-POP and mainstream cultural arts, Korean stage planners are playing a significant role worldwide. Typically, stage planners determine the timing and venue of performances and take responsibility for the entire process leading up to the completion of the event, acting as overall directors. They conduct thorough analyses on what performances people desire, whether similar events have already taken place, and if the emotional expression aligns with the intended message. Successful performances are scrutinized for the strategies used to captivate the audience. Those responsible for bringing the performances planned by stage planners to life on stage are the staff. Consequently, stage planners organize various staff members responsible for directing, choreography, music, stage design, lighting, costumes, makeup, etc. They also oversee the preparation process, secure the necessary funds, check preparations, and guide the director in staging scenes.

One of the most notable Korean stage planners is Kim Sang-wook, the CEO of PLAN A, who has orchestrated numerous performances, including the 'Love Yourself' tour by BTS.

== Show control based venues ==
Many live shows around the world are produced with the foreknowledge that they will have a very long run, often measured in years. These are usually known quantities that are very expensive productions and have a guaranteed audience because of their location. They may be on cruise ships, in theme parks, Las Vegas or at destination resorts. These shows warrant very long-range development and planning and use stage managers to run almost all technical elements in the show, without many of the other traditional crew members, such as sound, lighting and rigging operators. In these cases, show control systems are installed and connected to all other technical systems in the theatre, which are specifically designed to be controlled by show control and to operate safely with minimal supervision. Stage managers working these shows usually have the additional responsibility for programming the show control system, and often the other control systems as well.

== Different areas of stage management ==
The role of stage manager evolved from an amalgamation of various positions in theater over several centuries and is still generally known for its integral relationship with theater. Many other types of productions and events have incorporated the position of stage management, however. Some of the most common are opera, music and dance concerts, film and television.

For music concerts, stage management includes a large variety of responsibilities depending on both the venue and the size and expertise of the musical group coming into the venue. Some of the responsibilities of a concert stage manager include overseeing the schedule for load in and out of equipment, seeing to the comfort of the group which can include arranging refreshments and or transportation, sometimes arranging how and where merchandise is to be sold at the venue, and above all, as with all areas of stage management, watching out for the safety of all participants in the experience including performers, audience, and any crews required.

Beyond technical and logistical oversight, stage managers in institutional or public theaters also navigate complex organizational dynamics. They balance the artistic demands of a production with the administrative, financial, and sometimes democratic pressures inherent in public cultural organizations.

== Stage managers and unions ==
Stage managers often ensure safe working conditions in the theatrical space by working closely with theatrical unions to keep rehearsals and performances on time, safe, and efficient.

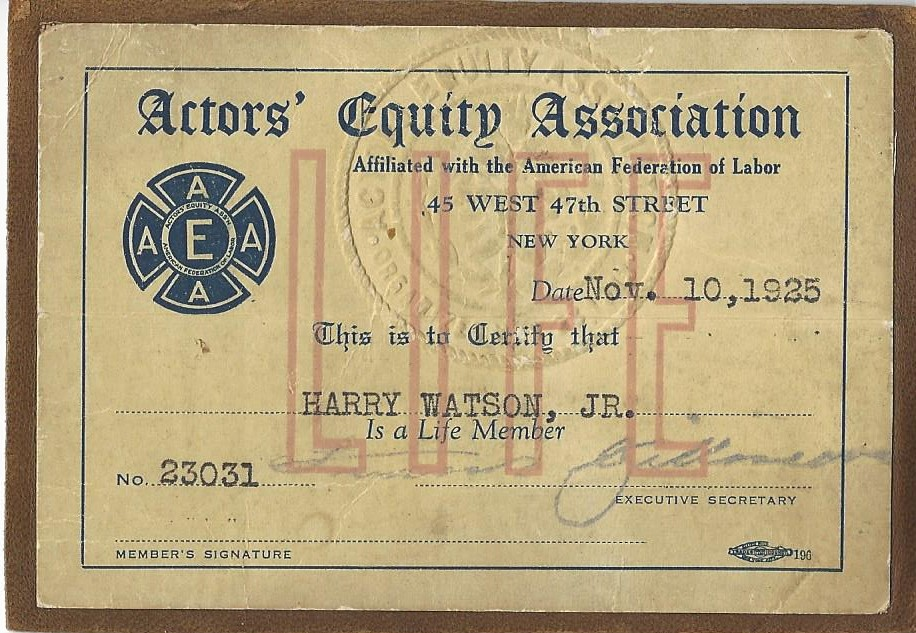
Harry Watson Jr. Actors Equity Association Card

=== Actors' Equity Association ===
Commonly referred to as Equity, AEA is the American union for stage managers and actors. The AEA works to negotiate and provide performers and stage managers quality living conditions, livable wages, and benefits.

=== Related Unions ===
American stage managers work closely with the following unions. Stage managers often have an in depth knowledge of their sister unions:

- IATSE: The union representing theatrical stage hands. IATSE also represents other crafts including makeup and hair designers, costume designers, child-actor guardians, and the film industry crafts.
- USA: American entertainment industry union. In theatre they represents the scenic crafts.
- AFM: Union representing American musicians and laborers.
- Teamsters: A major American labor union historically and primarily representing workers in transportation and logistics.
- DGA: Union representing film and television directors. Since a 2010 merger with the Stage Directors Guild (SDG), it also represents associate directors, stage managers, and production associates working under its jurisdiction in television and film.
- SAG-AFTRA: A labor union representing media professionals, including film and television actors, journalists, and other performers.

== See also ==
- Film crew
- Prompt corner
- Show control
- Stagecraft
- Television crew
- Theatre technique
- Theatre
