= Prompter (opera) =

The prompter (French/German: souffleur; Italian: rammentatore, suggeritore) in an opera house is a person who feeds the singers the opening words of each phrase, helps performers adjust for missed notes or vocal entrances, and ensures that the libretto is followed. Prompts may be mouthed silently, spoken lyrically, or spoken more loudly depending on the performance space, however, prompts are intended to be audible only on stage. This is in contrast to the prompter in theatre who aids actors who have forgotten their words or lines.

Opera prompters are traditionally housed in a small wooden box at the center-front edge of the stage, above the orchestra pit. They are visible to the performers and no one else. Modern advancements include air conditioning and small display screens to facilitate monitoring the performance.

Prompters attend all rehearsals, mark up any adjustments or clarifications to the score, and generally "prepare" singers for a role. Their profile is low, and opera program books often credit them only under "musical preparation" or some similar moniker. However, occasionally singers or conductors (e.g. at the Met) will acknowledge or bend down to shake their hands during curtain calls of premieres or chorally complex operas.
