= Vocal pedagogy =

Study of the art and science of voice instruction

The anatomy of the vocal folds
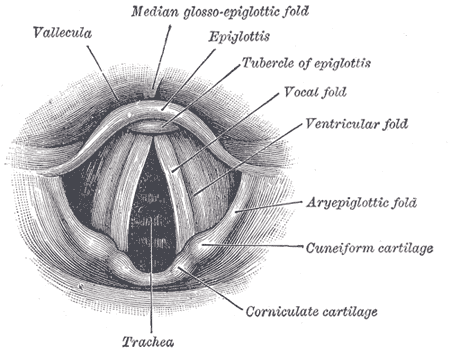
- Laryngoscopic view of the vocal folds

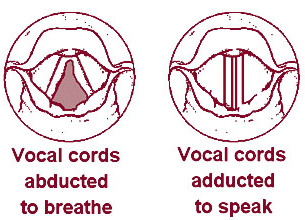
- Abduction and adduction

Details
- Precursor: Sixth pharyngeal arch
- Nerve: N. laryngeus recurrens and N. laryngeus superior

Identifiers
- Latin: plica vocalis

Vocal pedagogy is the study of the art and science of voice instruction. It is used in the teaching of singing and assists in defining what singing is, how singing works, and how singing technique is accomplished.

Vocal pedagogy covers a broad range of aspects of singing, ranging from the physiological process of vocal production to the artistic aspects of interpretation of songs from different genres or historical eras. Typical areas of study include:

- Human anatomy and physiology as it relates to the physical process of singing.
- Breathing and air support for singing
- Posture for singing
- Phonation
- Vocal resonation or voice projection
- Diction, vowels and articulation
- Vocal registration
- Sostenuto and legato for singing
- Other singing elements, such as range extension, tone quality, vibrato, coloratura
- Vocal health and voice disorders related to singing
- Vocal styles, such as learning to sing opera, belt, or art song
- Phonetics
- Voice classification

All of these different concepts are a part of developing vocal technique. Not all voice teachers have the same opinions within every topic of study which causes variations in pedagogical approaches and vocal technique.

== History ==
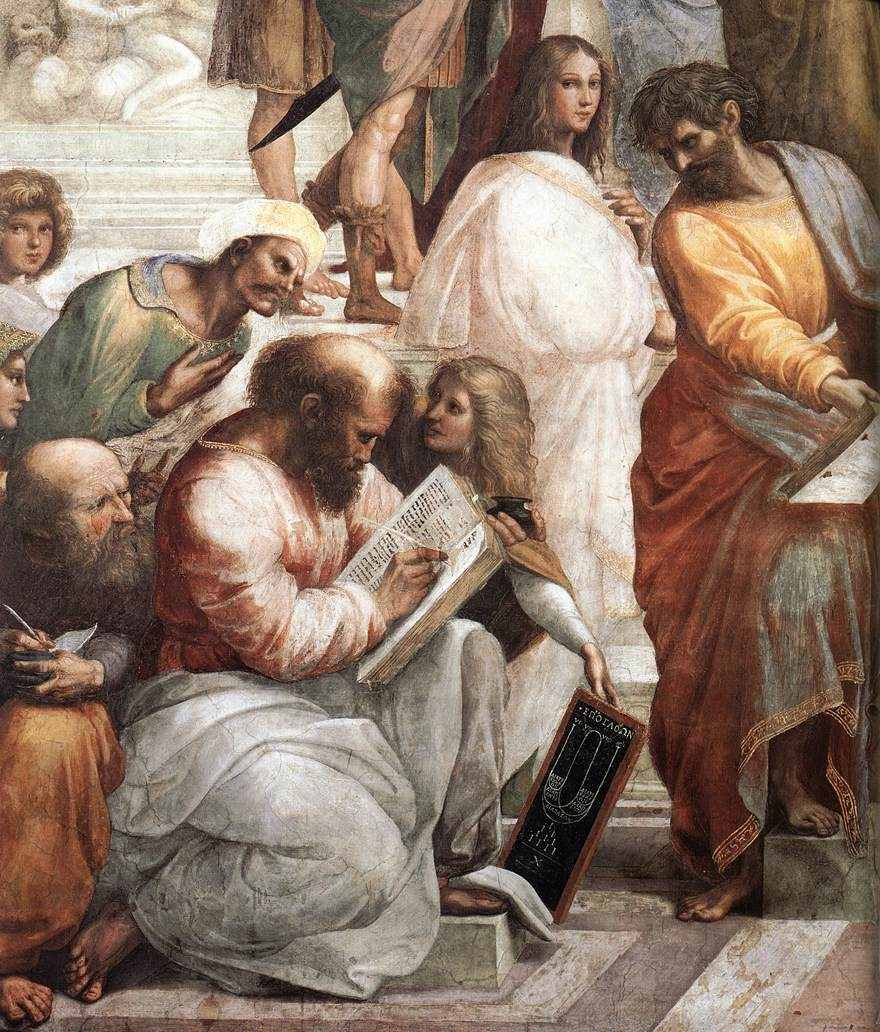
Pythagoras, the man in the center with the book, teaching music, in The School of Athens by Raphael

Within Western culture, the study of vocal pedagogy began in Ancient Greece. Scholars such as Alypius and Pythagoras studied and made observations on the art of singing. It is unclear, however, whether the Greeks ever developed a systematic approach to teaching singing as little writing on the subject survives today.

The first surviving record of a systematized approach to teaching singing was developed in the medieval monasteries of the Roman Catholic Church sometime near the beginning of the 13th century. As with other fields of study, the monasteries were the center of musical intellectual life during the medieval period and many men within the monasteries devoted their time to the study of music and the art of singing. Highly influential in the development of a vocal pedagogical system were monks Johannes de Garlandia and Jerome of Moravia who were the first to develop a concept of vocal registers. These men identified three registers: chest voice, throat voice, and head voice (pectoris, guttoris, and capitis). Their concept of head voice, however, is much more similar to the modern pedagogists understanding of the falsetto register. Other concepts discussed in the monastic system included vocal resonance, voice classification, breath support, diction, and tone quality to name a few. The ideas developed within the monastic system highly influenced the development of vocal pedagogy over the next several centuries including the Bel canto style of singing.

With the onset of the Renaissance in the 15th century, the study of singing began to move outside of the church. The courts of rich patrons, such as the Dukes of Burgundy who supported the Burgundian School and the Franco-Flemish School, became secular centers of study for singing and all other areas of musical study. The vocal pedagogical methods taught in these schools, however, were based on the concepts developed within the monastic system. Many of the teachers within these schools had their initial musical training from singing in church choirs as children. The church also remained at the forefront of musical composition at this time and remained highly influential in shaping musical tastes and practices both in and outside the church. It was the Catholic Church that first popularized the use of castrato singers in the 16th century, which ultimately led to the popularity of castrato voices in Baroque and Classical operas.

While the church maintained its dominance on intellectual and cultural life, there are individual examples of writers on voice pedagogy from this period who were from outside the church who put forward new ways of thinking and talking about the art of singing; although they lacked the wider influence of the monastic writers. The physician and court singer Giovanni Camillo Maffei was the first writer on vocal pedagogy to incorporate knowledge of the physiology of the voice into a theory of singing in his treatise Discorso delta voce e del modo d'apparare di cantar di garganta, and Scala naturale, overo Fantasia dolcissima, intorno alle cose occulte e desiderate nella filosofia (Venice, 1564).

It was not until the development of opera in the 17th century that vocal pedagogy began to break away from some of the established thinking of the monastic writers and develop deeper understandings of the physical process of singing and its relation to key concepts like vocal registration and vocal resonation. It was also during this time that noted voice teachers began to emerge. Giulio Caccini is an example of an important early Italian voice teacher. In the late 17th century, the bel canto method of singing began to develop in Italy. This style of singing had a huge impact on the development of opera and the development of vocal pedagogy during the Classical and Romantic periods. It was during this time that teachers and composers first began to identify singers by and write roles for more specific voice types. However, it was not until the 19th century that more clearly defined voice classification systems like the German Fach system emerged. Within these systems, more descriptive terms were used in classifying voices such as coloratura soprano and lyric soprano.

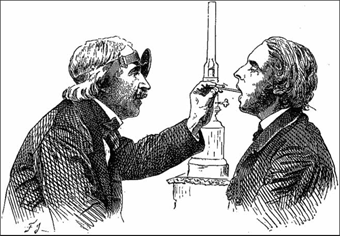
Examining the vocal mechanism with a laryngoscope, late 19th century

Voice teachers in the 19th century continued to train singers for careers in opera. Manuel Patricio Rodríguez García is often considered one of the most important voice teachers of the 19th century, and is credited with the development of the laryngoscope and the beginning of modern voice pedagogy.

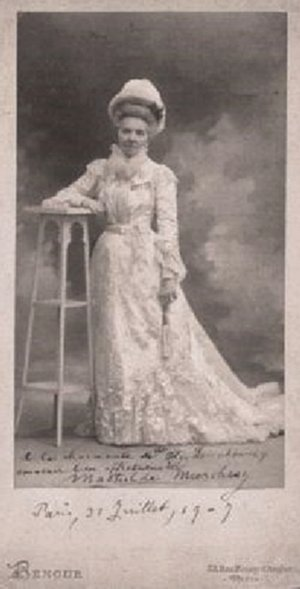
Mathilde Marchesi was both an important singer and teacher of singing at the turn of the 20th century.

The field of voice pedagogy became more fully developed in the middle of the 20th century. A few American voice teachers began to study the science, anatomy, and physiology of singing, especially Ralph Appelman at Indiana University, Oren Brown at the Washington University School of Medicine and later the Juilliard School, and William Vennard at the University of Southern California. This shift in approach to the study of singing led to the rejection of many of the assertions of the bel canto singing method, most particularly in the areas of vocal registration and vocal resonation. As a result, there are currently two predominating schools of thought among voice teachers today, those who maintain the historical positions of the bel canto method and those who choose to embrace more contemporary understandings based in current knowledge of human anatomy and physiology. There are also those teachers who borrow ideas from both perspectives, creating a hybrid of the two.

Appelman and Vennard were also part of a group of voice instructors who developed courses of study for beginning voice teachers, adding these scientific ideas to the standard exercises and empirical ways to improve vocal technique, and by 1980 the subject of voice pedagogy was beginning to be included in many college music degree programs for singers and vocal music educators.

More recent works by authors such as Richard Miller and Johan Sundberg have increased the general knowledge of voice teachers, and scientific and practical aspects of voice pedagogy continue to be studied and discussed by professionals. In addition, the creation of organisations such as the National Association of Teachers of Singing (now an international organization of Vocal Instructors) has enabled voice teachers to establish more of a consensus about their work, and has expanded the understanding of what singing teachers do.

== Topics of study ==
=== Pedagogical philosophy ===
There are basically three major approaches to vocal pedagogy. They're all related to how the mechanistic and psychological controls are employed while singing. Some voice instructors advocate an extreme mechanistic approach that believes that singing is largely a matter of getting the right physical parts in the right places at the right time, and that correcting vocal faults is accomplished by calling direct attention to the parts which are not working well. On the other extreme, is the school of thought that believes that attention should never be directed to any part of the vocal mechanism—that singing is a matter of producing the right mental images of the desired tone, and that correcting vocal faults is achieved by learning to think the right thoughts and by releasing the emotions through interpretation of the music. Most voice teachers, however, believe that the truth lies somewhere in between the two extremes and adopt a composite of those two approaches.

=== The nature of vocal sounds ===
==== Physiology of vocal sound production ====
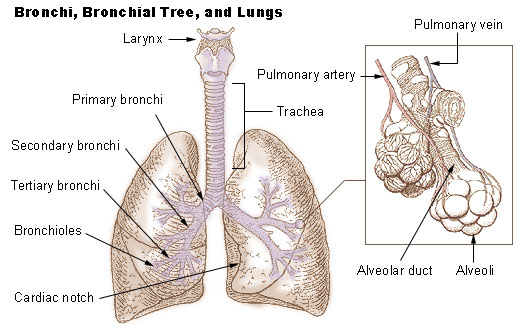

There are four physical processes involved in producing vocal sound: respiration, phonation, resonation, and articulation. These processes occur in the following sequence:

1. Breath is taken
2. Sound is initiated in the larynx
3. The vocal resonators receive the sound and influence it
4. The articulators shape the sound into recognizable units

Although these four processes are to be considered separately, in actual practice they merge into one coordinated function. With an effective singer or speaker, one should rarely be reminded of the process involved as their mind and body are so coordinated that one only perceives the resulting unified function. Many vocal problems result from a lack of coordination within this process.

===== Respiration =====
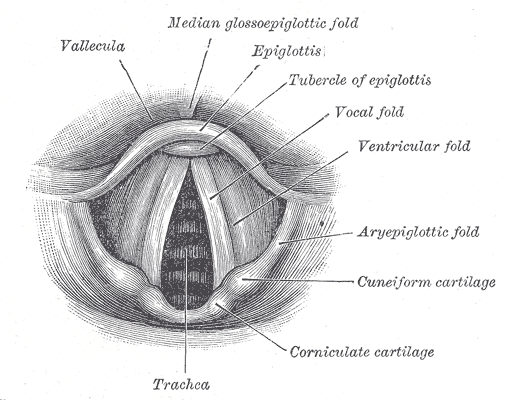
A labeled anatomical diagram of the vocal folds or cords

In its most basic sense, respiration is the process of moving air in and out of the body—inhalation and exhalation. Sound is produced in the larynx. But producing the sound would not be possible without a power source: the flow of air from the lungs. This flow sets the vocal folds into motion to produce sound. Breathing for singing and speaking is a more controlled process than is the ordinary breathing used for sustaining life. The controls applied to exhalation are particularly important in good vocal technique.

===== Phonation =====
Phonation is the process of producing vocal sound by the vibration of the vocal folds that is in turn modified by the resonance of the vocal tract. It takes place in the larynx when the vocal folds are brought together and breath pressure is applied to them in such a way that vibration ensues causing an audible source of acoustic energy, i.e., sound, which can then be modified by the articulatory actions of the rest of the vocal apparatus. The vocal folds are brought together primarily by the action of the interarytenoid muscles, which pull the arytenoid cartilages together.

===== Resonation =====
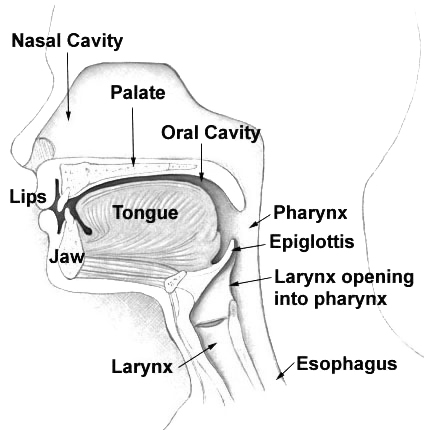

Vocal resonation is the process by which the basic product of phonation is enhanced in timbre and/or intensity by the air-filled cavities through which it passes on its way to the outside air. Various terms related to the resonation process include amplification, enrichment, enlargement, improvement, intensification, and prolongation, although in strictly scientific usage acoustic authorities would question most of them. The main point to be drawn from these terms by a singer or speaker is that the result of resonation is, or should be, to make a better sound.

There are seven areas that may be listed as possible vocal resonators. In sequence from the lowest within the body to the highest, these areas are the chest, the tracheal tree, the larynx itself, the pharynx, the oral cavity, the nasal cavity, and the sinuses.

Research has shown that the larynx, the pharynx and the oral cavity are the main resonators of vocal sound, with the nasal cavity only coming into play in nasal consonants, or nasal vowels, such as those found in French. This main resonating space, from above the vocal folds to the lips is known as the vocal tract. Many voice users experience sensations in the sinuses that may be misconstrued as resonance. However, these sensations are caused by sympathetic vibrations, and are a result, rather than a cause, of efficient vocal resonance.

===== Articulation =====
Places of articulation (passive & active): 1. Exo-labial, 2. Endo-labial, 3. Dental, 4. Alveolar, 5. Post-alveolar, 6. Pre-palatal, 7. Palatal, 8. Velar, 9. Uvular, 10. Pharyngeal, 11. Glottal, 12. Epiglottal, 13. Radical, 14. Postero-dorsal, 15. Antero-dorsal, 16. Laminal, 17. Apical, 18. Sub-apical

Articulation is the process by which the joint product of the vibrator and the resonators is shaped into recognizable speech sounds through the muscular adjustments and movements of the speech organs. These adjustments and movements of the articulators result in verbal communication and thus form the essential difference between the human voice and other musical instruments. Singing without understandable words limits the voice to nonverbal communication. In relation to the physical process of singing, vocal instructors tend to focus more on active articulation as opposed to passive articulation. There are five basic active articulators: the lip ("labial consonants"), the flexible front of the tongue ("coronal consonants"), the middle/back of the tongue ("dorsal consonants"), the root of the tongue together with the epiglottis ("pharyngeal consonants"), and the glottis ("glottal consonants"). These articulators can act independently of each other, and two or more may work together in what is called coarticulation.

Unlike active articulation, passive articulation is a continuum without many clear-cut boundaries. The places linguolabial and interdental, interdental and dental, dental and alveolar, alveolar and palatal, palatal and velar, velar and uvular merge into one another, and a consonant may be pronounced somewhere between the named places.

In addition, when the front of the tongue is used, it may be the upper surface or blade of the tongue that makes contact ("laminal consonants"), the tip of the tongue ("apical consonants"), or the under surface ("sub-apical consonants"). These articulations also merge into one another without clear boundaries.

===== Interpretation =====
Interpretation is sometimes listed by voice teachers as a fifth physical process even though strictly speaking it is not a physical process. The reason for this is that interpretation does influence the kind of sound a singer makes which is ultimately achieved through a physical action the singer is doing. Although teachers may acquaint their students with musical styles and performance practices and suggest certain interpretive effects, most voice teachers agree that interpretation can not be taught. Students who lack a natural creative imagination and aesthetic sensibility can not learn it from someone else. Failure to interpret well is not a vocal fault, even though it may affect vocal sound significantly.

==== Classification of vocal sounds ====
Vocal sounds are divided into two basic categories—vowels and consonants—with a wide variety of sub-classifications. Voice teachers and serious voice students spend a great deal of time studying how the voice forms vowels and consonants, and studying the problems that certain consonants or vowels may cause while singing. The International Phonetic Alphabet is used frequently by voice teachers and their students.

==== Problems in describing vocal sounds ====
Describing vocal sound is an inexact science largely because the human voice is a self-contained instrument. Since the vocal instrument is internal, the singer's ability to monitor the sound produced is complicated by the vibrations carried to the ear through the Eustachean (auditory) tube and the bony structures of the head and neck. In other words, most singers hear something different in their ears/head than what a person listening to them hears. As a result, voice teachers often focus less on how it "sounds" and more on how it "feels". Vibratory sensations resulting from the closely related processes of phonation and resonation, and kinesthetic ones arising from muscle tension, movement, body position, and weight serve as a guide to the singer on correct vocal production.

Another problem in describing vocal sound lies in the vocal vocabulary itself. There are many schools of thought within vocal pedagogy and different schools have adopted different terms, sometimes from other artistic disciplines. This has led to the use of a plethora of descriptive terms applied to the voice which are not always understood to mean the same thing. Some terms sometimes used to describe a quality of a voice's sound are: warm, white, dark, light, round, reedy, spread, focused, covered, swallowed, forward, ringing, hooty, bleaty, plummy, mellow, pear-shaped, and so forth.

=== Body alignment ===
The singing process functions best when certain physical conditions of the body exist. The ability to move air in and out of the body freely and to obtain the needed quantity of air can be seriously affected by the body alignment of the various parts of the breathing mechanism. A sunken chest position will limit the capacity of the lungs, and a tense abdominal wall will inhibit the downward travel of the diaphragm. Good body alignment allows the breathing mechanism to fulfill its basic function efficiently without any undue expenditure of energy. Good body alignment also makes it easier to initiate phonation and to tune the resonators as proper alignment prevents unnecessary tension in the body. Voice Instructors have also noted that when singers assume good body alignment it often provides them with a greater sense of self-assurance and poise while performing. Audiences also tend to respond better to singers with good body alignment. Habitual good body alignment also ultimately improves the overall health of the body by enabling better blood circulation and preventing fatigue and stress on the body.

=== Breathing and breath support ===
Demonstration of the small amount and low velocity of the breathing air during supported singing with a candle light

All singing begins with breath. All vocal sounds are created by vibrations in the larynx caused by air from the lungs. Breathing in everyday life is a subconscious bodily function which occurs naturally; however, the singer must have control of the intake and exhalation of breath to achieve maximum results from their voice.

Natural breathing has three stages: a breathing-in period, a breathing-out period, and a resting or recovery period; these stages are not usually consciously controlled. Within singing there are four stages of breathing:

1. breathing-in period (inhalation)
2. setting up controls period (suspension)
3. controlled exhalation period (phonation)
4. recovery period

These stages must be under conscious control by the singer until they become conditioned reflexes. Many singers abandon conscious controls before their reflexes are fully conditioned which ultimately leads to chronic vocal problems.

=== Voice classification ===
In European classical music and opera, voices are treated like musical instruments. Composers who write vocal music must have an understanding of the skills, talents, and vocal properties of singers. Voice classification is the process by which human singing voices are evaluated and are thereby designated into voice types. These qualities include but are not limited to: vocal range, vocal weight, vocal tessitura, vocal timbre, and vocal transition points such as breaks and lifts within the voice. Other considerations are physical characteristics, speech level, scientific testing, and vocal registration. The science behind voice classification developed within European classical music and has been slow in adapting to more modern forms of singing. Voice classification is often used within opera to associate possible roles with potential voices. There are currently several different systems in use within classical music including: the German Fach system and the choral music system among many others. No system is universally applied or accepted.

However, most classical music systems acknowledge seven different major voice categories. Women are typically divided into three groups: soprano, mezzo-soprano, and contralto. Men are usually divided into four groups: countertenor, tenor, baritone, and bass. When considering children's voices, an eighth term, treble, can be applied. Within each of these major categories there are several sub-categories that identify specific vocal qualities like coloratura facility and vocal weight to differentiate between voices.

Within choral music, singers voices are divided solely on the basis of vocal range. Choral music most commonly divides vocal parts into high and low voices within each sex (SATB). As a result, the typical choral situation affords many opportunities for misclassification to occur. Since most people have medium voices, they must be assigned to a part that is either too high or too low for them; the mezzo-soprano must sing soprano or alto and the baritone must sing tenor or bass. Either option can present problems for the singer, but for most singers there are fewer dangers in singing too low than in singing too high.

Within contemporary forms of music (sometimes referred to as Contemporary Commercial Music), singers are classified by the style of music they sing, such as jazz, pop, blues, soul, country, folk, and rock styles. There is currently no authoritative voice classification system within non-classical music. Attempts have been made to adopt classical voice type terms to other forms of singing but such attempts have been met with controversy. The development of voice categorizations were made with the understanding that the singer would be using classical vocal technique within a specified range using unamplified (no microphones) vocal production. Since contemporary musicians use different vocal techniques, microphones, and are not forced to fit into a specific vocal role, applying such terms as soprano, tenor, baritone, etc. can be misleading or even inaccurate.

==== Dangers of quick identification ====
Many voice teachers warn of the dangers of quick identification. Premature concern with classification can result in misclassification, with all its attendant dangers. Vennard says:

"I never feel any urgency about classifying a beginning student. So many premature diagnoses have been proved wrong, and it can be harmful to the student and embarrassing to the teacher to keep striving for an ill-chosen goal. It is best to begin in the middle part of the voice and work upward and downward until the voice classifies itself."

Most voice teachers believe that it is essential to establish good vocal habits within a limited and comfortable range before attempting to classify the voice. When techniques of posture, breathing, phonation, resonation, and articulation have become established in this comfortable area, the true quality of the voice will emerge and the upper and lower limits of the range can be explored safely. Only then can a tentative classification be arrived at, and it may be adjusted as the voice continues to develop. Many acclaimed voice instructors suggest that teachers begin by assuming that a voice is of a medium classification until it proves otherwise. The reason for this is that the majority of individuals possess medium voices and therefore this approach is less likely to misclassify or damage the voice.

=== Vocal registration ===
Vocal registration refers to the system of vocal registers within the human voice. A register in the human voice is a particular series of tones, produced in the same vibratory pattern of the vocal folds, and possessing the same quality. Registers originate in laryngeal function. They occur because the vocal folds are capable of producing several different vibratory patterns. Each of these vibratory patterns appears within a particular range of pitches and produces certain characteristic sounds. The term register can be somewhat confusing as it encompasses several aspects of the human voice. The term register can be used to refer to any of the following:

- A particular part of the vocal range such as the upper, middle, or lower registers.
- A resonance area such as chest voice or head voice.
- A phonatory process
- A certain vocal timbre
- A region of the voice which is defined or delimited by vocal breaks.
- A subset of a language used for a particular purpose or in a particular social setting.

In linguistics, a register language is a language which combines tone and vowel phonation into a single phonological system.

Within speech pathology the term vocal register has three constituent elements: a certain vibratory pattern of the vocal folds, a certain series of pitches, and a certain type of sound. Speech pathologists identify four vocal registers based on the physiology of laryngeal function: the vocal fry register, the modal register, the falsetto register, and the whistle register. This view is also adopted by many teachers of singing.

Some voice teachers, however, organize registers differently. There are over a dozen different constructs of vocal registers in use within the field. The confusion which exists concerning what a register is, and how many registers there are, is due in part to what takes place in the modal register when a person sings from the lowest pitches of that register to the highest pitches. The frequency of vibration of the vocal folds is determined by their length, tension, and mass. As pitch rises, the vocal folds are lengthened, tension increases, and their thickness decreases. In other words, all three of these factors are in a state of flux in the transition from the lowest to the highest tones.

If a singer holds any of these factors constant and interferes with their progressive state of change, his laryngeal function tends to become static and eventually breaks occur with obvious changes of tone quality. These breaks are often identified as register boundaries or as transition areas between registers. The distinct change or break between registers is called a passaggio or a ponticello. Vocal instructors teach that with study a singer can move effortlessly from one register to the other with ease and consistent tone. Registers can even overlap while singing. Teachers who like to use this theory of "blending registers" usually help students through the "passage" from one register to another by hiding their "lift" (where the voice changes).

However, many voice instructors disagree with this distinction of boundaries blaming such breaks on vocal problems which have been created by a static laryngeal adjustment that does not permit the necessary changes to take place. This difference of opinion has effected the different views on vocal registration.

=== Coordination ===
Singing is an integrated and coordinated act and it is difficult to discuss any of the individual technical areas and processes without relating them to the others. For example, phonation only comes into perspective when it is connected with respiration; the articulators affect resonance; the resonators affect the vocal folds; the vocal folds affect breath control; and so forth. Vocal problems are often a result of a breakdown in one part of this coordinated process which causes voice teachers to frequently focus in, intensively, on one area of the process with their student until that issue is resolved. However, some areas of the art of singing are so much the result of coordinated functions that it is hard to discuss them under a traditional heading like phonation, resonation, articulation, or respiration.

Once the voice student has become aware of the physical processes that make up the act of singing and of how those processes function, the student begins the task of trying to coordinate them. Inevitably, students and teachers will become more concerned with one area of the technique than another. The various processes may progress at different rates, with a resulting imbalance or lack of coordination. The areas of vocal technique which seem to depend most strongly on the student's ability to coordinate various functions are:

1. Extending the vocal range to its maximum potential
2. Developing consistent vocal production with a consistent tone quality
3. Developing flexibility and agility
4. Achieving a balanced vibrato

==== Developing the singing voice ====
Some consider that singing is not a natural process but is a skill that requires highly developed muscle reflexes, but others consider that some ways of singing can be considered as natural. Singing does not require much muscle strength but it does require a high degree of muscle coordination. Individuals can develop their voices further through the careful and systematic practice of both songs and vocal exercises. Voice teachers instruct their students to exercise their voices in an intelligent manner. Singers should be thinking constantly about the kind of sound they are making and the kind of sensations they are feeling while they are singing.

===== Exercising the singing voice =====
There are several purposes for vocal exercises, including:

1. Warming up the voice
2. Extending the vocal range
3. "Lining up" the voice horizontally and vertically
4. Acquiring vocal techniques such as legato, staccato, control of dynamics, rapid figurations, learning to comfortably sing wide intervals, and correcting vocal faults.

===== Extending the vocal range =====
An important goal of vocal development is to learn to sing to the natural limits of one's vocal range without any undesired changes of quality or technique. Voice instructors teach that a singer can only achieve this goal when all of the physical processes involved in singing (such as laryngeal action, breath support, resonance adjustment, and articulatory movement) are effectively working together. Most voice teachers believe that the first step in coordinating these processes is by establishing good vocal habits in the most comfortable tessitura of the voice first before slowly expanding the range beyond that.

There are three factors which significantly affect the ability to sing higher or lower:

1. The Energy Factor – In this usage the word energy has several connotations. It refers to the total response of the body to the making of sound. It refers to a dynamic relationship between the breathing-in muscles and the breathing-out muscles known as the breath support mechanism. It also refers to the amount of breath pressure delivered to the vocal folds and their resistance that pressure, and it refers to the dynamic level of the sound.
2. The Space Factor – Space refers to the amount of space created by the moving of the mouth and the position of the palate and larynx. Generally speaking, a singer's mouth should be opened wider the higher they sing. The internal space or position of the soft palate and larynx can be widened by the relaxing of the throat. Voice teachers often describe this as feeling like the "beginning of a yawn".
3. The Depth Factor – In this usage the word depth has two connotations. It refers to the actual physical sensations of depth in the body and vocal mechanism and it refers to mental concepts of depth as related to tone quality.

McKinney says, "These three factors can be expressed in three basic rules: (1) As you sing higher, you must use more energy; as you sing lower, you must use less. (2) As you sing higher, you must use more space; as you sing lower, you must use less. (3) As you sing higher, you must use more depth; as you sing lower, you must use less."

=== General music studies ===
Some voice teachers will spend time working with their students on general music knowledge and skills, particularly music theory, music history, and musical styles and practices as it relates to the vocal literature being studied. If required they may also spend time helping their students become better sight readers, often adopting solfège, which assigns certain syllables to the notes of the scale.

=== Performance skills and practices ===
Since singing is a performing art, voice teachers spend some of their time preparing their students for performance. This includes teaching their students etiquette of behavior on stage such as bowing, learning to manage stage fright, addressing problems like nervous tics, and the use of equipment such as microphones. Some students may also be preparing for careers in the fields of opera or musical theater where acting skills are required. Many voice instructors will spend time on acting techniques and audience communication with students in these fields of interest. Students of opera also spend a great deal of time with their voice teachers learning foreign language pronunciations.

== See also ==
- Human voice
- Voice teacher
- Throat singing
