= Head voice =

Varied term used in vocal musical pedagogy

Head voice is a term used in vocal music. The use of this term varies widely within vocal pedagogical circles, and there is no single consistent opinion among vocal music professionals in regard to this term. Head voice can be used in relation to the following:

- A particular part of the vocal range or type of vocal register
- A vocal resonance area
- A specific vocal timbre

== History ==
The term goes back at least as far as the Roman tradition of rhetorical instruction. Quintilian (ca. AD 95) recommends teaching students ut quotiens exclamandum erit lateris conatus sit ille, non capitis ("that when the voice has to be raised the effort comes from the lungs and not from the head," Inst. 1.11.8, transl. Russell). The first recorded mention of the term in a musical context was around the 13th century, when it was distinguished from the throat and the chest voice (pectoris, guttoris, capitis—at this time it is likely head voice referred to the falsetto register) by the writers Johannes de Garlandia and Jerome of Moravia. The term was later adopted within bel canto, the Italian opera singing method, where it was identified as the highest of three vocal registers: the chest, passaggio and head registers. This approach is still taught by some vocal instructors today.

However, as knowledge of human physiology has increased over the past two hundred years, so has the understanding of the physical process of singing and vocal production. As a result, many vocal instructors have redefined or even abandoned the use of the term head voice. In particular, the use of the term head register has become controversial since vocal registration is more commonly seen today as a product of laryngeal function. For this reason, many vocal instructors argue that it is meaningless to speak of registers being produced in the head. The vibratory sensations that are felt in the head are resonance phenomena and should be described in terms related to vocal resonance, not to registers. These vocal instructors prefer the term "head voice" over the term "head register". These vocal instructors also hold that many of the problems which people identify as register problems are really problems of resonance adjustment. This helps to explain the controversy over this terminology. Also, the term head register is not used within speech pathology and is not one of the four main vocal registers identified by speech pathologists. The following is an overview of the two predominant views on head voice within vocal pedagogy.

== Differing views on head voice ==
=== Head voice and vocal registration ===
One prevailing practice within vocal pedagogy is to divide both men and women's voices into three registers. Men's voices are divided into "chest register", "head register", and "falsetto register" and women's voices into "chest register", "middle register", and "head register". According to this practice, singing in the head register feels to the singer as if the tone is resonating in their head (rather than primarily in the chest or throat). According to an early 20th-century book written by David Clippinger, all voices have a head register, whether bass or soprano.

Clippinger claims that males and females switch registers at the same absolute pitches. He also states that at about E♭ or E above middle C, the tenor passes from what is usually called open to covered tone, but which might better be called from chest to head voice. At the same absolute pitches, the alto or soprano passes from the chest to the middle register. According to Clippinger, there is every reason to believe that the change in the mechanism for male voices into head register is the same as that which occurs in the female voice as it goes into the middle register at the same pitches.

The contemporary vocal pedagogy instructor Bill Martin seconds the view that the change from chest voice to head voice occurs at around E_{4} in all voices, including the bass, but Martin states that in the coloratura soprano, it is more likely to occur at F_{4}. A recent book by a former teacher at Oberlin College Conservatory of Music and a vocal pedagogy teacher, Richard Miller, states that in the "tenore lirico", the higher part of the singing voice above the secondo passaggio at G_{4} extending upwards is referred to as "full voice in head", or voce piena in testa, effectively stating the head register begins at G_{4} in the "tenore lirico", not at E_{4}. According to Singing For Dummies, the bass changes from chest voice into middle voice around A_{3} or A♭_{3} below Middle C and changes into his head voice around D_{4} or C♯_{4} above Middle C.

In the head register (which is above the chest register), some of the bottom end leaves the voice, but it's still, according to Martin, a voice capable of much power.

Explanations for the physiological mechanisms behind the head voice can alter from voice teacher to voice teacher. This is because, according to Clippinger, "In discussing the head voice it is the purpose to avoid as much as possible the mechanical construction of the instrument".

However, not all vocal teachers agree with this view. Thomas Appell's 1993 book Can You Sing a HIGH C Without Straining? aimed to refute the theory that all singers switch registers at the same absolute pitch. Appell defined chest voice as resonance below the vocal folds and head voice as resonance above the vocal folds. He recorded examples of male and female singers changing from chest voice to head voice at different pitches in an attempt to prove that the transition pitch is a function of the intensity of the vocal tone and is not absolute. At higher vocal cord tension (intensity of singing), Appell shows that the pitch at which a singer transitions from chest to head voice will be higher. At lower vocal cord tension (intensity of singing), Appell shows that the pitch at which a singer transitions from chest to head voice will be lower.

=== Head voice and vocal resonation ===
This view is that since all registers originate in laryngeal function, it is meaningless to speak of registers being produced in the head. The vibratory sensations which are felt in the head are resonance phenomena and should be described in terms related to resonance, not to registers. These vocal instructors prefer the term "head voice" over the term register and divide the human voice into four registers: the vocal fry register, the modal register, the falsetto register, and the whistle register. This view is more consistent with modern understandings of human physiology and in keeping with stroboscope videos of laryngeal function during vocal phonation. Tarneaud says, "during singing, the vibration of the vocal folds impresses periodic shakes on the laryngeal cartilage which transmits them to the bones in the thorax via the laryngeal depressors, and to the bony structures in the head via the laryngeal elevators. Singers feel these shakes in the form of thoracic and facial vibrations". These internal phonatory sensations produced by laryngeal vibrations are called "resonance" by singers and teachers of singing. There are seven parts of the human body that act as resonators, and of those seven, the three most effective resonators that help amplify and create the most pleasing sounds are all located in the head: the pharynx, the oral cavity, and the nasal cavity.

=== Not falsetto ===
Resonances and registration aside, the term "head voice" is commonly used to mean "high notes that are not falsetto or strained". For example, when Pavarotti, Stevie Wonder or Bill Withers slide from chest voice to a tenor high C (C_{5}) in full, balanced voice, this is referred to as "head voice". (Pavarotti's range was C♯3 to F5, but beyond D5 (E♭5 to F5) he sang in a strong or reinforced falsetto.)

Beginning singers who have difficulty controlling their vocal break need to be taught to eliminate or control the physiological conditions associated with falsetto or strain in a process called "head voice". A strong falsetto is called a reinforced falsetto and a very light head voice is called "voce di testa bianca" or ''white head voice.''

High notes that are sung with balanced physiology do tend to have better resonance than falsetto or strained notes, so this definition doesn't usually contradict the other two.

== See also ==
- Chest voice
- Falsetto register
- Human voice
- Tessitura
- Voice organ
- Voice projection
- Vocal registration
- Vocal resonation
