= Register (music) =

Musical terminology referring to range or pitch

A register is the range within pitch space of some music or often musical speech. It may describe a given pitch or pitch class (or set of them), a human voice or musical instrument (or group of them), or both, as in a melody or part. It is also often related to timbre and musical form. In musical compositions, it may be fixed or "frozen".

== Relation to other musical elements or parameters ==
Register is often understood in relation to other elements of music, sometimes called parameters.

=== Relation to pitch ===
A "higher" register may be said to indicate a "higher" pitch. For example, violins may be said to be in a "higher" register than cellos. (Note: Describing audio frequencies in terms of vertical pitch space is an example of a conceptual metaphor, one that is not a cultural universal. See also conceptual metaphor theory in cognitive linguistics, as well as linguistic relativity.) This is often denoted concisely using subscripted numerals in scientific pitch notation.

=== Relation to timbre ===
The register in which an instrument plays, or in which a part is written, affects the quality of sound, or its timbre.

=== Relation to form ===
Register is also used structurally in musical form, with the climax of a piece usually being in the highest register of that piece.

==== Fixed or "frozen" register ====
Some modernist and especially twelve-tone or serial pieces have fixed register (sometimes called frozen register), allowing a pitch class to be expressed through only one pitch. This technique is often associated with or attributed to Anton Webern, and it later appears in the music of Arthur Berger, Pierre Boulez, Elliott Carter, and Karlheinz Stockhausen.

== Dramatic or expressive function ==
Registral expansion is the widening of a melodic, harmonic, or textural range across higher and lower pitches, creating a sense of growth, intensification, or dramatic unfolding.

== Practical contexts ==
=== Human voice ===
A "register" of the human voice, such as whistle register, is a series of tones of like quality originating through operation of the larynx. The constituent tones result from similar patterns of vibration in the vocal folds, which can generate several different such patterns, each resulting in characteristic sounds within a particular range of pitches. The term has wide application and can refer to any of several aspects of the human voice, including the following:

- A particular segment of the vocal range;
- A resonance area such as chest voice or head voice;
- A phonatory process;
- A certain vocal timbre; or
- A region of the voice set off by vocal breaks.

Speech pathologists and many vocal pedagogues recognize four vocal registers: the vocal fry, modal, falsetto, and whistle. To delineate these registers, pathologists specify vibratory pattern of the vocal folds, sequential pitches, and type of sound.

=== Wind instruments ===
In the context of wind instruments, the word register usually distinguishes pitch ranges produced using different normal modes of the air column, with higher registers produced by overblowing. The timbres of different woodwind instrument registers tend to be markedly different.

==== Flute ====
The Western concert flute plays approximately three and a half octaves and generally has three complete registers and one partial register. The musical note C4 (corresponding to middle C on the piano) would be in that instrument's first register, whereas the second register — where overblowing is needed — begins at E5.

==== Clarinet ====
On the clarinet, the notes from (written) G4 or A4 to B♭4 sometimes are regarded as a separate "throat register", even though both they and the notes from F♯4 down are produced using the instrument's lowest normal mode. The timbre of the throat notes differs, and the throat register's fingerings also are distinctive, using special keys and not the standard tone holes used for other notes.

== See also ==
- Ambitus
- Chest register
- Head register
- Organ stop and organ registration
- Tessitura
- Vocal registration
