= Extension (music) =

Musical notes outside the standard range

In music, an extension is a set of musical notes that lie outside the standard range or tessitura.

== Staff ==
A note that lies outside the lines of a musical staff is an extension of the staff. The note will lie on a ledger line. Middle C, for example, is an extension note on both treble and bass clefs, however is not outside the grand staff. Soprano C and Deep C lie two ledger lines above treble and below bass respectively (as well as the grand staff).

== Instruments ==
An instrumental extension is a range of playable notes outside the normal range of the instrument. A baritone horn, if played by a skillful player, can be played an octave above the normal range. Since this is not standard, these notes would be an extension. (See also: Crook (music)). With the bowed string instruments, lower pitches than the standard range are sometimes used through scordatura in which the lowest string is tuned down a note or two. The double bass sometimes uses a C extension extending the range of the E string downwards to C. Some Bösendorfer pianos have extra keys, extending the range several notes lower than a standard 88-key piano.

== Voice ==
In vocal performance, a singer's extension is all notes that are a part of the singer's vocal range that lie outside the singer's tessitura. This usually include notes that a singer can hit, but does not use on a regular basis. For example, a coloratura soprano regularly, as defined by range, will sing in the whistle register. A standard mezzo-soprano has a range to the high F or G above middle C, however a mezzo-soprano with good head voice extension can rival the coloratura soprano in range. However, since her normal tessitura is mezzo-soprano (or under Soprano C), her abilities in the whistle register would be considered her extension.

Although not commonly thought of, extension can be applied to the lower register as well. A baritone may actually be able to reach depths of low D or E below low C, but is more comfortable in the higher baritone tessitura. A special class of soprano, the soprano sfogato, while retaining the high notes characteristic of the soprano vocal range, may be able to hit down to E3 using the chest voice. Due to the rarity of true contraltos, usually mezzo-sopranos with strong low extension are employed instead in roles such as "Ulrica" in Verdi's Un ballo in maschera.

For men, their vocal extension upwards is usually simultaneous with his falsetto, unless they are a countertenor, barbershop tenor, or its equivalent in popular music.

Uses of extensions include:

- providing an acuto, i.e. an accented high note which may or may not be written in the score, e.g. in cadenzas, mad scenes, etc.
- providing a cadence in acuti, e.g. E♭6 at the end of "Sempre libera" in La traviata (which had in fact became a tradition if the soprano is able and the conductor allows it).
- ornamental purposes, usually in massive scale works, e.g. "D'amor al dolce impero" in Rossini's Armida
