= Vocal range =

Range of pitches of a human voice

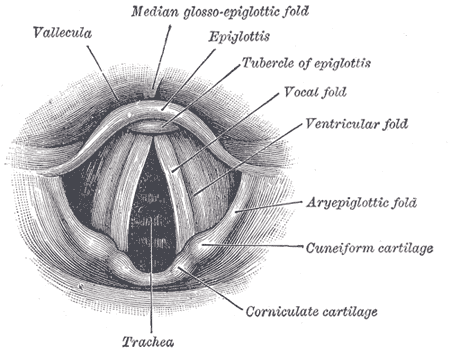
Diagram of the human larynx

Vocal range is the range of pitches that a human voice can phonate. A common application is within the context of singing, where it is used as a defining characteristic for classifying singing voices into voice types. It is also a topic of study within linguistics, phonetics, and speech-language pathology, particularly in relation to the study of tonal languages and certain types of vocal disorders, although it has little practical application in terms of speech.

== Singing and the definition of vocal range ==
While the broadest definition of "vocal range" is simply the span from the lowest to the highest note a particular voice can produce, this broad definition is often not what is meant when "vocal range" is discussed in the context of singing. Vocal pedagogists tend to define the vocal range as the total span of "musically useful" pitches that a singer can produce. This is because some of the notes a voice can produce may not be considered usable by the singer within performance for various reasons. For example, within opera all singers must project over an orchestra without the aid of a microphone. An opera singer would therefore only be able to include the notes that they are able to adequately project over an orchestra within their vocal range. In contrast, a pop artist could include notes that could be heard with the aid of a microphone.

Another factor to consider is the use of different forms of vocal production. The human voice is capable of producing sounds using different physiological processes within the larynx. These different forms of voice production are known as vocal registers. While the exact number and definition of vocal registers is a controversial topic within the field of singing, the sciences identify only four registers: the whistle register, the falsetto register, the modal register, and the vocal fry register. Typically only the usable pitches within the modal register—the register used in normal speech and most singing—are included when determining singers' vocal ranges. There are exceptions, as in opera, where countertenors employ falsetto and coloratura sopranos use the whistle register; notes from these registers would therefore be included in the vocal ranges of these voices.

== Evolution of sexual dimorphism in human voice pitch ==
The upper pitch range of the human voice is, on average, about half as high in males as in females. Even after controlling for body height and volume, the male voice remains lower. Charles Darwin suggested that the human voice evolved through intersexual sexual selection, via female mate choices. Puts (2005) showed that preference for male voice pitch changed according to the stage of the menstrual cycle while Puts (2006) found women preferred lower male voices mainly for short-term, sexual relationships. Intrasexual selection, via male competition, also causes a selection in voice pitch. Pitch is related to interpersonal power and males tend to adjust their pitch according to their perceived dominance when speaking to a competitor.

== Vocal range and voice classification ==
Vocal range plays such an important role in classifying singing voices into voice types that sometimes the two terms are confused with one another. A voice type is a particular kind of human singing voice perceived as having certain identifying qualities or characteristics; vocal range being only one of those characteristics. Other factors are vocal weight, vocal tessitura, vocal timbre, vocal transition points, physical characteristics, speech level, scientific testing, and vocal registration. All of these factors combined are used to categorize a singer's voice into a particular kind of singing use or voice type.

The discipline of voice classification developed within European classical music and is not generally applicable to other forms of singing. Voice classification is often used within opera to associate possible roles with potential voices. There are several systems in use including the German Fach system, the Italian opera tradition, and French opera tradition. There are other systems of classification as well, most commonly the choral music system.

No system is universally applied or accepted. Most of the voice types identified by such systems, however, are sub-types that fall under seven different major voice categories that are for the most part acknowledged across all of the major voice classification systems. Women are typically divided into three main groups: soprano, mezzo-soprano, and contralto. Men are usually divided into four main groups: countertenor, tenor, baritone, and bass. When considering the pre-pubescent voices of children an eighth term, treble, can be applied. Within each of these major categories there are several sub-categories that identify specific vocal qualities like coloratura facility and vocal weight to differentiate between voices.

Vocal range itself does not determine a singer's voice type. While each voice type does have a general vocal range associated with it, human singing voices may possess vocal ranges that encompass more than one voice type or are in between the typical ranges of two voice types. Therefore, voice teachers use vocal range as only one factor among many in classifying a singer's voice. More important than range in voice classification is tessitura, or where the voice is most comfortable singing, and vocal timbre, or the characteristic sound of the singing voice. For example, a female singer may have a vocal range that encompasses the low notes of a mezzo-soprano and the high notes of a soprano. A voice teacher would therefore look to see whether the singer was more comfortable singing higher, or lower. If she were more comfortable singing higher, then the teacher would probably classify her as a soprano. If the singer were more comfortable singing in the mid to lower part of their voice the teacher would probably classify her as a mezzo-soprano. The teacher would also consider the sound of the voice; sopranos tend to have a lighter and less rich vocal sound than a mezzo-soprano. A voice teacher, however, would never classify a singer in more than one voice type, regardless of the size of the vocal range of the singer.

=== Operatic six basic voice types ===
Within the operatic systems of classification, there are six basic voice types. The ranges given below are approximations and are not meant to be too rigidly applied.

- Soprano: the highest female voice typically between C_{4} and G_{6}
- Mezzo-soprano: the middle female voice typically between A_{3} and G_{5}
- Contralto: the lowest female voice typically between F_{3} and C_{5}
- Tenor: the highest male voice typically between D_{3} and A_{4}
- Baritone: the middle male voice typically between B_{2} and F_{4}
- Bass: the lowest male voice typically between G_{2} and C_{4}

Some men, in falsetto voice or as a result of certain rare physiological conditions, can sing in the same range as women. Within classical music, these do not fall into the female categories; they are instead called countertenors. Within contemporary music, however, the use of the term tenor for these male voices is more appropriate.

Within choral music there are only four categories for adult singers: soprano and alto for women, tenor and bass for men.

In the UK, the term "male alto" refers to a man who uses falsetto vocal production to sing in the alto section of a chorus. This practice is much less common outside the UK where the term countertenor is more often applied. Countertenors are also widely employed within opera as solo vocalists, though the term "male alto" is never used to refer to a solo vocalist.

Children's voices, both male and female, are described as trebles, although boy soprano is widely used as well.

== See also ==
- Ambitus
- Voice classification in non-classical music
- Scientific pitch notation
