= Tenore di grazia =

Lightweight, flexible tenor voice type

Tenore di grazia, also called leggero tenor (Note: Often also called leggiero tenor, although that is not an Italian term.) (graceful, light, and lightweight tenor, respectively), is a lightweight, flexible tenor voice type. The tenor roles written in the early 19th-century Italian operas are invariably leggero tenor roles, especially those by Rossini such as Lindoro in L'italiana in Algeri, Don Ramiro in La Cenerentola, and Almaviva in Il barbiere di Siviglia; and those by Bellini such as Gualtiero in Il pirata, Elvino in La sonnambula and Arturo in I puritani. Many Donizetti roles, such as Nemorino in L'elisir d'amore and Ernesto in Don Pasquale, Tonio in La fille du régiment, are also tenore di grazia roles. One of the most famous leggero tenors of that period was Giovanni Battista Rubini, for whom Bellini wrote nearly all his operas.

== Classification and range ==
The tenor leggero voice is often misclassified. There are several reasons for this, the first being the lower register of the leggero tenor. The leggero tenor can go quite low, approximately to G below low C G_{2}. Because of this, the leggero tenor is often misclassified as a baritone, normally a lyric baritone. This voice might also be classified as another type of tenor such as dramatic tenor. However, the leggero tenor possesses something that the other tenors do not: an upper extension that when not fully developed, sounds almost like a falsetto. This "falsetto" however is part of a full voice mechanism and is more connected to what appears to sound like the full voice than a falsetto would. The upper extension normally starts around A-flat below Tenor High C and goes up to as high as the singer is comfortable with, normally E above High C and sometimes to F♯ or G. The highest vocal range needed in opera for this voice type is F above Tenor High C. This is sung as part of the role of Arturo in I puritani.

The light French lyric tenor is also often confused with the leggero tenor. Examples of the French tradition of a light and lyrical voice can be found in roles such as Georges Brown in La dame blanche, Chapelou in Le postillon de Lonjumeau, Nadir in Les pêcheurs de perles, Vincent in Mireille, and Gérald in Lakmé.
