= Chest voice =

Voice type

Chest voice is a term used within vocal music. The use of this term varies widely within vocal pedagogical circles. There is no consistent opinion among vocal music professionals regarding the term. Chest voice can be used in relation to:

- A particular part of the vocal range or type of vocal register
- A vocal resonance area
- A specific vocal timbre

== History ==
The first recorded mention of the term chest voice was around the 13th century, when it was distinguished from the throat and the head voice (pectoris, guttoris, capitis—at this time it is likely head voice referred to the falsetto register) by the writers Johannes de Garlandia and Jerome of Moravia. The term was later redefined during the bel canto period when it was identified as the lowest of three vocal registers: the chest, passaggio and head registers. This approach is still taught by some vocal pedagogists.

However as knowledge of human anatomy has increased over the past two hundred years, so has the understanding of the physical process of singing and vocal production. As a result, many vocal pedagogists have redefined or even abandoned the use of the term chest voice. In particular, the use of the term chest register has become controversial since vocal registration is more commonly seen as a product of laryngeal function that is unrelated to the anatomy of the chest and lungs. For this reason, many vocal pedagogists argue that it is meaningless to speak of registers being produced in the chest. The vibratory sensations which are felt in these areas are resonance phenomena and should be described in terms related to vocal resonance, not to registers. These vocal pedagogists prefer the term "chest voice" over the term "chest register". These vocal pedagogists also hold that many of the problems which people identify as register problems are really problems of resonance adjustment. This helps to explain the controversy over this terminology. Also, the term chest register is not used within speech pathology and is not one of the four main vocal registers identified by speech pathologists. For the purposes of this article, the term "chest voice" is adopted as it is less controversial.

The contemporary use of the term chest voice often refers to a specific kind of vocal coloration or vocal timbre. In classical singing, its use is limited entirely to the lower part of the modal register or normal voice. Chest timbre can add a wonderful array of sounds to a singer’s vocal interpretive palette. The introduction of chest timbre is common to singers trained in the historic Italian school, but largely shunned among singers who have emerged from the Nordic/Germanic tradition. Such approval or disapproval is largely an aesthetic decision. However, the use of overly strong chest voice in the higher registers in an attempt to hit higher notes in the chest can lead to forcing. Forcing can lead consequently to vocal deterioration.

== Physiological process ==
As the opinions on what exactly chest voice is vary greatly, there is no one consensus on the physiological production of chest voice. However, there is a developing body of scientific knowledge regarding the production of various definitions of chest voice:

=== Laryngeal registration understanding ===
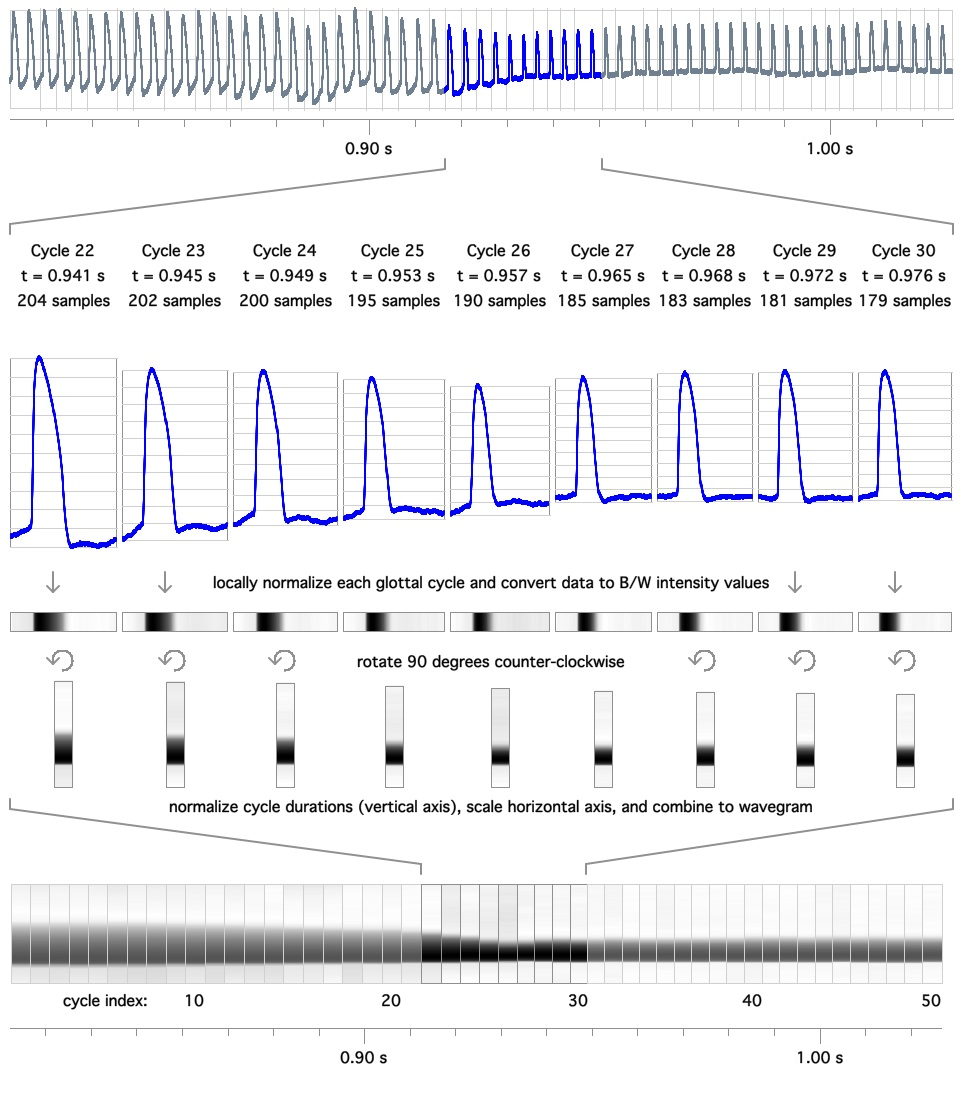
EGG graph indicates vocal fold vibration between the time 0.90 to 1 (seconds). Darker areas refer to closed positioning of vocal folds and lighter areas refer to open positioning which in turn allows us to determine closed quotient ratio.

This viewpoint considers “chest voice” as the result of phonation where thyroarytenoid muscle function heavily dominates cricothyroid muscle function. It is generally also characterized by a higher closed quotient value (a quotient of how long the vocal folds are touching to how long the cycle of vibration lasts) than “head voice”. A closed quotient ratio obtained by EGG (Electroglottography) around %65 and above is considered as a full chest singing (adducted chest voice) and a result around %48 can be viewed as a lyrical style singing (abducted chest voice).

=== Vocal resonance understanding ===
This view believes that the chest voice is a product not of vocal registration but vocal resonation. Opinions within this understanding vary. Although some pedagogists believe the chest is an effective resonator, most agree that chest voice actually resonates in the vocal tract while creating vibratory sensations in the chest. French otolaryngologist and phoniatrist Jean Tarneaud says,

"during singing, the vibration of the vocal folds impresses periodic shakes on the laryngeal cartilage which transmits them to the bones in the thorax via the laryngeal depressors, and to the bony structures in the head via the laryngeal elevators. Singers feel these shakes in the form of thoracic and facial vibrations".

These internal phonatory sensations produced by laryngeal vibrations are called "resonance" by singers and teachers of singing.

During singing in the lower register, the larynx is lowered since the muscles which connect it to the rib cage are tensed whereas the muscles above the larynx are not tensed. Consequently, a large proportion of the vibratory energy is transmitted to the thoracic area, giving singers the impression that their voice is resonating in the chest. This impression, however, is false. The chest by virtue of its design and location can make no significant contribution to the resonance system of the voice. The chest is on the wrong side of the vocal folds and there is nothing in the design of the lungs that could serve to reflect sound waves back toward the larynx.

== Acoustic buzz ==
Singing voice produces harmonics (a.k.a. buzz). The intended fundamental frequency along with the harmonics is known as pitch construct. Tenor, baritone, bass, alto, mezzo-soprano singers produce pro-dominant harmonics during singing when they perform in full chest voice. This allows us to determine if a voice is produced via full chest singing simply looking at the spectrogram. Sopranos and countertenors mainly produce the first four harmonics strongly and these harmonics are counted as a pure part of the pitch construct. Spectrogram images of a soprano or a countertenor indicate the strongest first four harmonics in full chest singing.

== See also ==
- Head voice
- Tessitura
- Vocal register
- Vocal resonation
