= Voice break =

Transitions between vocal registers

Voice break, also known as passaggio, generally refers to transitions between different vocal registers of the human voice. Although singing is mostly done using the modal register, it is important for more professional singers to be able to smoothly move between different vocal registers.

Unintentional voice breaks are called voice cracks.

Voice break may also refer to the deepening of the male voice during puberty, known as the voice change.

== See also ==
- Voice change
- Puberty
