= Frozen register =

Frozen register may refer to:

- Frozen register (music), a compositional scheme by which each pitch class is expressed as one pitch
- Frozen register (sociolinguistics), a formal, unchanging language used in written or ritualized contexts
