= Giovanni Maffei =

Giovanni Maffei may refer to:

- Giovanni Camillo Maffei, 16th-century Italian doctor, philosopher and musician
- Giovanni Pietro Maffei (1533–1603), Italian Jesuit and author
