= William Vennard =

American opera singer (1909–1971)

William Vennard (January 31, 1909 Normal, Illinois – January 10, 1971, Los Angeles, California) was an American vocal pedagogist who researched the human voice and its use in singing. He was one of the driving forces behind a major shift within the field of vocal pedagogy during the middle of the 20th century.

Along with a few other American singing teachers, such as Ralph Appelman at Indiana University and Oren Brown at the Juilliard School, Vennard introduced contemporary scientific research in the areas of human anatomy and physiology into the study of singing. This shift in approach led to the rejection of many of the beliefs and practices held since the bel canto era, most particularly in the areas of vocal registration and vocal resonation. Vennard was renowned as an excellent teacher whose written works have influenced generations of singers, vocal pedagogues and voice scientists. He taught many successful singers including acclaimed mezzo-soprano Marilyn Horne, who studied under him at the University of Southern California.

== History ==
Vennard studied English at Taylor University in Upland, Indiana graduating with a bachelor's degree in 1930. He became interested in music and decided to pursue a career as an opera singer. He studied at Northwestern University earning a Bachelor of Music in Vocal Performance in 1941, followed by graduate studies at the American Conservatory of Music in Chicago, where he earned a master's degree in Vocal Performance in 1943. Vennard spent the next several years teaching part-time simultaneously at the Chicago Evangelistic Institute, DePaul University and the American Conservatory.

In 1946 he became a member of the faculty of music at the University of Southern California, chairing its voice department from 1950 – 1971.

Among the associations to which he belonged are the National Association of Teachers of Singing, which he served in several capacities, including national president. In 1970 he was awarded an honorary doctorate from Pepperdine University in recognition of his outstanding contributions to singing and the science of singing.

As a singer, Vennard was active in opera, oratorio and solo song; as a teacher of singing, many of his students achieved worldwide success. His renowned text, Singing, the Mechanism and the Technique, was one of the first complete texts regarding the singing voice and a constant resource for teachers and researchers alike for the following two decades. The text provides singers with the fundamental physics of sound, acoustics, correct breathing and posture, and an introduction to common terminology.

Vennard’s collaboration with Janwillem van den Berg resulted in his film Voice Production: the Vibrating Larynx. Winning several awards, including best medical research film from a festival in Prague in 1960, it shows the anatomy and physiology of voice production in the excised larynx. He was a pioneer in the science of singing and in voice pedagogy and was instrumental in fostering collaborative efforts between singers, physicists, psychologists and voice scientists.

In 2018, a symposium called The Art and Science of Great Teaching: Celebrating the Legacy of William Vennard was held at the University of Southern California's Doheny Memorial Library featuring presentations by Thomas Cleveland, Scott McCoy, Stephen F. Austin, Kari Ragan, Kenneth Bozeman, Lynn Helding, and Cindy Dewey; these are slated to be published by Inside View Press.

== Written works ==
- Singing, the Mechanism and the Technique, 1967
- Regulation of Register, Pitch and Intensity of Voice, 1970

== Sources ==
- Tom Cleveland. The New Grove Dictionary of Opera, edited by Stanley Sadie (1992). ISBN 0-333-73432-7 and ISBN 1-56159-228-5
- The Art and Science of Great Teaching: Celebrating the Legacy of William Vennard
