= Ambitus (music) =

Term for melodic range in medieval music

Range of a bassoon

In medieval music, ambitus (Ecclesiastical Latin: ['am.bi.t̪us]) is a Latin term literally meaning enclos[ur]e, and in Medieval Latin means the "range" of a melodic line, most usually referring to the range of scale degrees attributed to a given mode, particularly in Gregorian chant. In Gregorian chant specifically, the ambitus is the range, or the distance between the highest and lowest note. Different chants vary widely in their ambitus. Even relatively florid chants like Alleluias may have a narrow ambitus. Earlier writers termed the modal ambitus "perfect" when it was a ninth or tenth (that is, an octave plus one or two notes, either at the top or bottom or both), but from the late fifteenth century onward "perfect ambitus" usually meant one octave, and the ambitus was called "imperfect" when it was less, and "pluperfect" when it was more than an octave.

All of the church modes are distinguished in part by their ambitus. The plagal modes have the final in the middle of the ambitus, while the authentic modes generally go no more than one note below the final.

Ambitus may also mean the range of a voice, of an instrument, or more generally, of an entire piece of music, and describes its pitch extremes. For example, the ambitus of the concert grand piano may be given as A_{0}-C_{8}, where A_{0} is 27.5 Hz. Unlike the terms register and tessitura, ambitus does not refer to how notes are used in a piece.
