= Soprano =

Classical singing voice with the highest vocal range

A soprano (Italian pronunciation: [soˈpraːno]) is a type of classical singing voice and has the highest vocal range of all voice types. The soprano's vocal range (using scientific pitch notation) is from approximately middle C (C_{4}) = 261 Hz to A_{5} in choral music, or to soprano C (C_{6}) or higher in operatic music. In four-part chorale style harmony, the soprano takes the highest part, which often encompasses the melody. The soprano voice type is generally divided into the coloratura, soubrette, lyric, spinto, and dramatic soprano.

== Etymology ==
The word "soprano" comes from the Italian word sopra (above, over, on top of), as the soprano is the highest pitch human voice, often given to the leading female roles in operas. "Soprano" refers mainly to women, but it can also be applied to men; "sopranist" is the term for a male countertenor able to sing in the soprano vocal range, while a castrato is the term for a castrated male singer, typical of the 16th, 17th, and 18th centuries, and a treble is a boy soprano, whether they finished puberty or are still a child, as long as they are still able to sing in that range.

The term "soprano" is also based on the Latin word superius which, like soprano, referred to the highest pitch vocal range of all human voice types. The word superius was especially used in choral and other multi-part vocal music between the 13th and 16th centuries.

== Vocal range ==
Soprano vocal range (C_{4}–C_{6}) notated on the treble staff and on piano keyboard in green with dot marking middle C

The soprano has the highest vocal range of all voice types, with the highest tessitura. A soprano and a mezzo-soprano have a similar range, but their tessitura will lie in different parts of that range.

The low extreme for sopranos is roughly A_{3} or B♭_{3} (just below middle C). Within opera, the lowest demanded note for sopranos is F_{3} (from Richard Strauss's Die Frau ohne Schatten). Often low notes in higher voices will project less, lack timbre, and tend to "count less" in roles (although some Verdi, Strauss and Wagner roles call for stronger singing below the staff). However, rarely is a soprano simply unable to sing a low note in a song within a soprano role. Low notes can be reached with a lowered position of the larynx.

The high extreme, at a minimum, for non-coloratura sopranos is "soprano C" (C_{6} two octaves above middle C), and many roles in the standard repertoire call for C♯_{6} or D_{6}. A couple of roles have optional E♭_{6}s, as well. In the coloratura repertoire, several roles call for E♭_{6} on up to F_{6}. In rare cases, some coloratura roles go as high as G_{6} or G♯_{6}, such as Mozart's concert aria "Popoli di Tessaglia!", or the title role of Jules Massenet's opera Esclarmonde. While not necessarily within the tessitura, a good soprano will be able to sing her top notes full-throated, with timbre and dynamic control.

In opera, the tessitura, vocal weight, and timbre of voices, and the roles they sing, are commonly categorized into voice types, often called Fächer (sg. Fach, from German Fach or Stimmfach, "vocal category"). A singer's tessitura is where the voice has the best timbre, easy volume, and most comfort.

== In choral music ==
In SATB four-part mixed chorus, the soprano is the highest vocal range, above the alto, tenor, and bass. Sopranos commonly sing in the tessitura G_{4}-A_{5}. When the composer calls for divisi, sopranos can be separated into Soprano I (highest part) and Soprano II (lower soprano part).

In contrast to choral singing, in classical solo singing a person is classified through the identification of several vocal traits, including range, vocal timbre, vocal weight, vocal tessitura, vocal resonance, and vocal transition points (lifts or "passaggio") within the singer's voice.

These different traits are used to identify different sub-types within the voice. Within opera, particular roles are written with specific kinds of soprano voices in mind, causing certain roles to be associated with certain kinds of voices.

== Subtypes and roles in opera ==
Within the soprano voice type category are five generally recognized subcategories: coloratura soprano, soubrette, lyric soprano, spinto soprano, and dramatic soprano.

=== Coloratura ===
The coloratura soprano may be a lyric coloratura or a dramatic coloratura. The lyric coloratura soprano is a very agile light voice with a high upper extension capable of fast vocal coloratura. Light coloraturas have a range of approximately middle C (C_{4}) to "high F" (in alt) (F_{6}) with some coloratura sopranos being able to sing somewhat lower or higher, e.g. an interpolated A♭_{6} in the Doll Aria, "Les oiseaux dans la charmille", from The Tales of Hoffmann, e.g. by Rachele Gilmore in a 2009 performance, and a written A♮_{6} by Audrey Luna in 2017 in The Exterminating Angel, both at the Metropolitan Opera in New York.

The dramatic coloratura soprano is a coloratura soprano with great flexibility in high-lying velocity passages, yet with great sustaining power comparable to that of a full spinto or dramatic soprano. Dramatic coloraturas have a range of approximately "low B" (B_{3}) to "high F" (F_{6}) with some coloratura sopranos being able to sing somewhat higher or lower.

=== Soubrette ===
In classical music and opera, a soubrette soprano refers to both a voice type and a particular type of opera role. A soubrette voice is light with a bright, sweet timbre, a tessitura in the mid-range, and with no extensive coloratura. The soubrette voice is not a weak voice, for it must carry over an orchestra without a microphone like all voices in opera. The voice, however, has a lighter vocal weight than other soprano voices with a brighter timbre. Many young singers start out as soubrettes, but, as they grow older and the voice matures more physically, they may be reclassified as another voice type, usually either a light lyric soprano, a lyric coloratura soprano, or a coloratura mezzo-soprano. Rarely does a singer remain a soubrette throughout her entire career. A soubrette's range extends approximately from Middle C (C_{4}) to "high D" (D_{6}). The tessitura of the soubrette tends to lie a bit lower than the lyric soprano and spinto soprano.

=== Lyric ===
The lyric soprano is a warm voice with a bright, full timbre, which can be heard over a big orchestra. It generally has a higher tessitura than a soubrette and usually plays ingénues and other sympathetic characters in opera. Lyric sopranos have a range from approximately middle C (C_{4}) to "high D" (D_{6}).

The lyric soprano may be a light lyric soprano or a full lyric soprano. The light lyric soprano has a bigger voice than a soubrette but still possesses a youthful quality. The full lyric soprano has a more mature sound than a light-lyric soprano and can be heard over a bigger orchestra.

=== Spinto ===
Also lirico-spinto, Italian for "pushed lyric", the spinto soprano has the brightness and height of a lyric soprano, but can be "pushed" to dramatic climaxes without strain, and may have a somewhat darker timbre. Spinto sopranos have a range from approximately B (B_{3}) to "high D" (D_{6}).

=== Dramatic ===
A dramatic soprano (or soprano robusto) has a powerful, rich, emotive voice that can sing over a full orchestra. Usually (but not always) this voice has a lower tessitura than other sopranos, and a darker timbre. Dramatic sopranos have a range from approximately A (A_{3}) to "high C" (C_{6}).

Select dramatic sopranos, sometimes called "Wagnerian sopranos", are able project over large orchestras (made up of eighty or more instruments) and may be substantial and powerful throughout the registers.

=== Other types ===
Two other types of soprano are the Dugazon and the Falcon, which are intermediate voice types between the soprano and the mezzo-soprano: a Dugazon is a darker-colored soubrette, a Falcon a darker-colored soprano drammatico.

== See also ==
- Category of sopranos
- Fach, the German system for classifying voices
- Voice classification in non-classical music
- List of sopranos in non-classical music
- Chronological list of operatic sopranos
