= Giovanni Camillo Maffei =

Italian physician, philosopher and composer

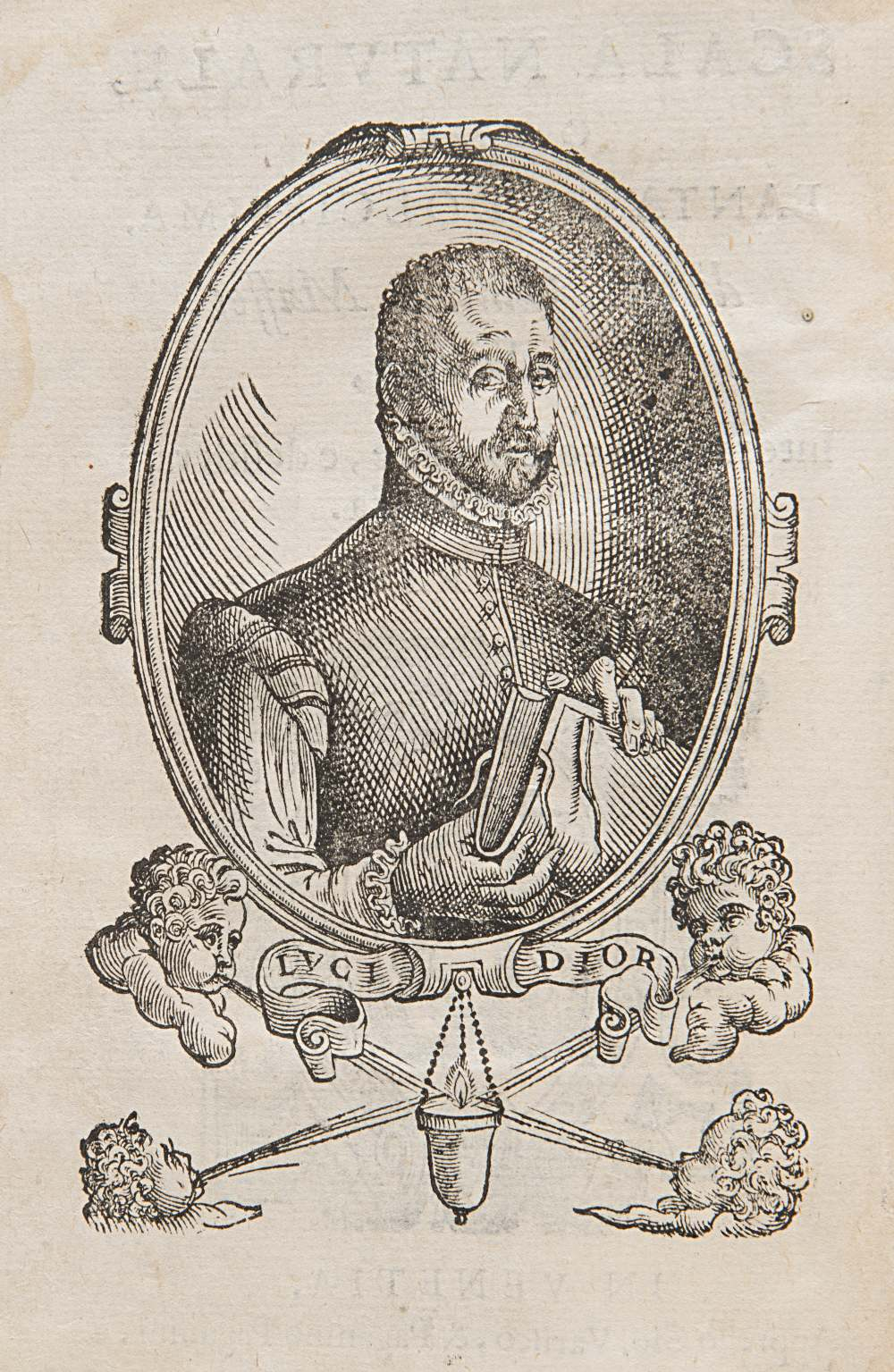
- Portrait of Giovanni Camillo Maffei from the 1864 edition of his letters.

Giovanni Camillo Maffei da Solofra (fl. 1562 – c. 1573) was an Italian doctor, philosopher, singer, and lutenist of the mid-16th century, in the late Renaissance. He is best known for his writing on vocal pedagogy, and is the first person to include vocal physiology into a theory of teaching singing.

== Life and career ==
Between 1562 and 1573 he lived in Naples, where he served Giovanni di Capua, count of Altavilla and music lover. In his philosophy he was Aristotelian. He wrote a treatise on vocal music, "Lettera sul canto", in which he sets forth rules for the singing of diminutions. The letter is included in the two volumes of his Lettere (Napoli, 1562) also cited as Discorso delta voce e del modo d'apparare di cantar di garganta, and Scala naturale, overo Fantasia dolcissima, intorno alle cose occulte e desiderate nella filosofia (Venice, 1564), dedicated to the Count of Altavilla, where it runs on various points of natural history, physics, meteorology, geology and chemistry.

Maffei's treatise on singing is important because it is the first known instance where a writer utilized knowledge of vocal physiology in a theory of vocal pedagogy. His work is considered valuable to historically informed performance of vocal music of the Italian Renaissance because of its discussion of improvisation practices of the period.

Nothing else is known about Maffei's life, including his place and date of birth and death.
