= Falsetto =

Vocal register just above the modal voice register

Falsetto (/fɔːlˈsɛtoʊ, fɒl-/ fawl-SET-oh, fol-, Italian: [falˈsetto]; Italian diminutive of falso, "false") is the vocal register occupying the frequency range just above the modal voice register and overlapping with it by approximately one octave. It is produced by the vibration of the ligamentous edges of the vocal cords, in whole or in part. Commonly cited in the context of singing, falsetto, a characteristic of phonation by both male and female sexes, is also one of four main spoken vocal registers recognized by speech pathology.

The term falsetto is most often used in the context of singing to refer to a type of vocal phonation that enables the singer to sing notes beyond the vocal range of the normal, or modal, voice (M1). The typical tone of falsetto register, or M2, usually has a characteristic breathy and flute-like sound relatively free of overtones—which is more limited than its modal counterpart in both dynamic variation and tone quality. However, William Vennard points out that while most untrained people can sound comparatively "breathy" or "hooty" when using falsetto production, there are in rarer cases individuals who have developed a much stronger falsetto sound production, which has more "ring" to it.

== Anatomical process ==
The modal voice, or modal register, and falsetto register differ primarily in the action of the vocal cords. Production of the normal voice involves vibration of the entire vocal cord, with the glottis opening first at the bottom and then at the top. Production of falsetto vibrates only the ligamentous edges of the vocal folds while leaving each fold's body relatively relaxed. Transition from modal voice to falsetto occurs when each vocal cord's main body, or vocalis muscle, relaxes, enabling the cricothyroid muscles to stretch the vocal ligaments. William Vennard describes this process as follows:

With the vocalis muscles relaxed it is possible for the cricothyroids to place great longitudinal tension upon the vocal ligaments. The tension can be increased in order to raise the pitch even after the maximum length of the cords has been reached. This makes the vocal folds thin so that there is negligible vertical phase difference. The vocalis muscles fall to the sides of the larynx and the vibration take place almost entirely in the ligaments.

In the modal register, the vocal folds (when viewed with a stroboscope) are seen to contact with each other completely during each vibration, closing the gap between them fully, if just for a very short time. This closure cuts off the escaping air. When the air pressure in the trachea rises as a result of this closure, the folds are blown apart, while the vocal processes of the arytenoid cartilages remain in apposition. This creates an oval gap between the folds and some air escapes, lowering the pressure inside the trachea. Rhythmic repetition of this movement creates the note.

Vocal fold, scheme

Glottal cycle, falsetto

In falsetto, however, the vocal folds are seen to be blown apart, and in untrained falsetto singers, a permanent oval orifice is left in the middle between the edges of the two folds through which a certain volume of air escapes continuously as long as the register is engaged (the singer is singing using the voice). In skilled countertenors, however, the mucous membrane of the vocal folds contact with each other completely during each vibration cycle. The arytenoid cartilages are held in firm apposition in this voice register also. The length or size of the oval orifice or separation between the folds can vary, but it is known to get bigger as the pressure of air pushed out is increased.

The folds are made up of elastic and fatty tissue. The folds are covered on the surface by laryngeal mucous membrane, which is supported deeper down underneath by the innermost fibres of the thyroarytenoid muscle. In falsetto, the extreme membranous edges (i.e., the edges furthest away from the middle of the gap between the folds) appear to be the only parts vibrating. The mass corresponding to the innermost part of the thyroarytenoid muscle remains still and motionless.

Some singers feel a sense of muscular relief when they change from the modal register to the falsetto register.

Research has revealed that not all speakers and singers produce falsetto in exactly the same way. Some speakers and singers leave the cartilaginous portion of the glottis open (sometimes called 'mutational chink'), and only the front two-thirds of the vocal ligaments enter the vibration. The resulting sound, which is typical of many adolescents, may be pure and flutelike, but is usually soft and anemic in quality. In others, the full length of the glottis opens and closes in each cycle. In still others, a phenomenon known as damping appears, with the amount of glottal opening becoming less and less as the pitch rises, until only a tiny slit appears on the highest pitches. The mutational chink type of falsetto is considered inefficient and weak, but there is little information available about the relative strengths and weaknesses of the other two types.

== Female falsetto ==
While the falsetto register is not sex-specific, prior to research done by scientists in the 1950s and 1960s, it was widely believed that only men were able to produce falsetto. One possible explanation for this failure to recognize the female falsetto sooner is that when men phonate in the falsetto register there is a much more pronounced change in timbre and dynamic level between the modal and falsetto registers than there is in female voices. This is due in part to the difference in the length and mass of the vocal folds and to the difference in frequency ranges. However, motion picture and video studies of laryngeal action prove that women can and do produce falsetto, and electromyographic studies by several leading speech pathologists and vocal pedagogists provide further confirmation.

While scientific evidence has proven that women have a falsetto register, the issue of 'female falsetto' has been met with controversy among teachers of singing. This controversy does not exist within the sciences and arguments against the existence of female falsetto do not align with current physiological evidence. Some pioneers in vocal pedagogy, like Margaret Green and William Vennard, were quick to adopt current scientific research in the 1950s, and pursued capturing the biological process of female falsetto on film. They went further to incorporate their research into their pedagogical method of teaching female singers. Others refused to accept the idea, and opposition to the concept of female falsetto has continued among some teachers of singing long after scientific evidence had proven the existence of female falsetto. Celebrated opera singer and voice teacher Richard Miller pointed out in his 1997 publication National Schools of Singing: English, French, German, and Italian that while the German school of voice teachers had largely embraced the idea of a female falsetto into pedagogical practice, there is division within the French and English schools and a complete rejection of the idea of female falsetto in the Italian school of singing. In his 2004 book, Solutions for Singers: Tools For Performers and Teachers, Miller said, "It is illogical to speak of a female falsetto, because the female is incapable of producing a timbre in the upper range that is radically different from its mezza voce or voce piena in testa qualities".

However, other writers of singing have warned about the dangers of failing to recognize that women have a falsetto register. McKinney, who expressed alarm that many books on the art of singing completely ignore or gloss over the issue of female falsetto or insist that women do not have falsetto, argues that many young female singers substitute falsetto for the upper portion of the modal voice. He believes that this failure to recognize the female falsetto voice has led to the misidentification of young contraltos and mezzo-sopranos as sopranos, as it is easier for these lower voice types to sing in the soprano tessitura using their falsetto register.

== Musical history ==
Use of falsetto voice in western music is very old. Its origins are difficult to trace because of ambiguities in terminology. Possibly when 13th century writers distinguished between chest, throat and head registers (pectoris, guttoris, capitis) they meant capitis to refer to what would be later called falsetto. By the 16th century the term falsetto was common in Italy. The physician, Giovanni Camillo Maffei, in his book Discorso della voce e del modo d'apparare di cantar di garganta in 1562, explained that when a bass singer sang in the soprano range, the voice was called "falsetto". In a book by GB Mancini, called Pensieri e riflessioni written in 1774, falsetto is equated with "voce di testa" (translated as 'head voice').

The falsetto register is used by male countertenors to sing in the alto and occasionally the soprano range and was the standard before women sang in choirs. Falsetto is occasionally used by early music specialists today and regularly in British cathedral choirs by men who sing the alto line.

There is a difference between the modern usage of the "head voice" term and its previous meaning in the renaissance as a type of falsetto, according to many singing professionals. These days, head voice is typically defined as a mix of chest and head voice, therefore created a stronger sound than falsetto. The falsetto can be coloured or changed to sound different. It can be given classical styling to sound as male classical countertenors make it sound, or be sung in more contemporary musical styles.

In opera, it is believed that the chest voice, middle voice and head voice occur in women. The head voice of a man is, according to David A. Clippinger generally equivalent to the middle voice of a woman. This may mean the head voice of a woman is a man's falsetto equivalent. Although, in contemporary teaching, some teachers no longer talk of the middle voice, choosing to call it the head voice as with men. Falsetto is not generally counted by classical purists as a part of the vocal range of anyone except countertenors. There are exceptions, however, such as the baryton-Martin which uses falsetto (see baritone article).

== Use in singing ==
Falsetto is more limited in dynamic variation and tone quality than the modal voice. Falsetto does not connect to modal voice except at very low volumes, leading to vocal breaks when transitioning from modal voice. In the absence of modern vocal training to hold back the volume of modal voice, in this overlapping area a given pitch in modal voice will be louder than the same pitch sung in falsetto. The type of vocal cord vibration that produces the falsetto voice precludes loud singing except in the highest tones of that register; it also limits the available tone colors because of the simplicity of its waveform. Modal voice is capable of producing much more complex waveforms and infinite varieties of tone color. Falsetto, however, does involve less physical effort by the singer than the modal voice and, when properly used, can make possible some desirable tonal effects.

== Use in speech ==
The ability to speak within the falsetto register is possible for almost all men and women. The use of falsetto is considered uncommon in normal Western speech and is most often employed within the context of humor. However, the use of falsetto speech varies by culture and its use has been studied in African Americans and gay men in certain contexts. Its use has also been noted in the U.S. South. Pitch changes ranging to falsetto are also characteristic of British English.

Some people who speak frequently or entirely in the falsetto register are identified by speech pathologists as suffering from a functional dysphonia. Falsetto also describes the momentary, but often repeated, fluctuations in pitch emitted by both sexes while undergoing voice change during adolescence. These changes, however, are more apparent and occur with greater frequency in boys than they do in girls. Failure to undergo proper voice-change is called puberphonia.

== See also ==
- Creaky voice
- Human voice
