= Voice projection =

Vocal technique of speaking or singing powerfully and clearly

Voice projection is the strength of speaking or singing whereby the human voice is used powerfully and clearly. It is a technique employed to command respect and attention, such as when a teacher talks to a class, or simply to be heard clearly, as used by an actor in a theatre or during drills.

Breath technique is essential for proper voice projection. In normal talking, one may use air from the top of the lungs. A properly projected voice uses air flowing from the expansion of the diaphragm. In good vocal technique, well-balanced respiration is especially important to maintaining vocal projection. The goal is to isolate and relax the muscles controlling the vocal folds, so that they are unimpaired by tension. The external intercostal muscles are used only to enlarge the chest cavity, whilst the counterplay between the diaphragm and abdominal muscles is trained to control airflow.

Stance is also important. Actors are taught to stand upright with the feet shoulder width apart and the upstage foot (foot further from the audience, when not facing the audience) slightly forward. This improves balance and breathing.

In singing, voice projection is often equated with acoustic resonance, the concentrated pressure through which one produces a focused sound. True resonance will produce the greatest amount of projection available to a voice by utilizing all the key resonators found in the vocal cavity. As the sound being produced and these resonators find the same overtones, the sound will begin to spin as it reaches the ideal singer's formant at about 2800 Hz. The size, shape, and hardness of the resonators all factor into the production of these overtones and ultimately determine the projective capacities of the voice.

== See also ==
- Human microphone, where speech is "amplified" by the audience, repeating the speaker
