= Passaggio =

Transition area between vocal registers

Passaggio (Italian pronunciation: [pasˈsaddʒo]) is a term used in classical singing to describe the transition area between the vocal registers. The passaggi (plural) of the voice lie between the different vocal registers, such as the chest voice, where any singer can produce a powerful sound, the middle voice, and the head voice, where a penetrating sound is accessible, but usually only through vocal training. The historic Italian school of singing describes a primo passaggio and a secondo passaggio connected through a zona di passaggio in the male voice and a primo passaggio and secondo passaggio in the female voice. A major goal of classical voice training in classical styles is to maintain an even timbre throughout the passaggio. Through proper training, it is possible to produce a resonant and powerful sound.

== Vocal registers ==
Vocal registers may be described as "perceptually distinct regions of vocal quality that can be maintained over some ranges of pitch and loudness." Discrepancies in terminology exist between different fields of vocal study, such as teachers and singers, researchers, and clinicians: for example, voice scientists may primarily see registration as "acoustic events". For singers, it is more common to explain registration events based on the physical sensations they feel when singing. There are also discrepancies in the terminology used to talk about vocal registration between speech pathologists and singing teachers. Since this article discusses the passaggio, which is a term used by classical singers, the registers will be discussed as they are in the field of singing rather than speech pathology and science.

Most voices can be divided roughly into three main registers.

1. Head
2. Middle or mixed
3. Chest

These three main registers are described as having a rich timbre, because of the overtones due to the sympathetic resonance within the human body. Their names are derived from the area in which the singer feels these resonant vibration in the body. The chest register, more commonly referred to as the chest voice, is the lowest of the registers. When singing in the chest voice the singer feels sympathetic vibration in the chest. This is the register that people most commonly use while speaking. The middle voice falls in-between the chest voice and head voice. The head register, or the head voice, is the highest of the main vocal registers. When singing in the head voice, the singer may feel sympathetic vibration occurring in the face or another part of the head. Where these registers lie in the voice is dependent on sex and the voice type within each sex.

There are an additional two registers called the falsetto and flageolet (whistle) registers, which lie above the head register. Training is often required to access the pitches within these registers. Men and women with lower voices rarely sing in these registers. Lower voiced women in particular receive very little if any training in the flageolet register. Men have one more additional register called the strohbass, which lies below the chest voice. Singing in this register is hard on the vocal cords, and therefore, is hardly ever used.

The transitions between these registers are known as the passaggi.

== Register ranges ==
=== Male voices ===
Here are the register ranges offered by Richard Miller for a lyric tenor:

- Strohbass – G2 to C3
- Chest – C3 to G3
- Middle (or mixed) – G3 to G4
  - Lower Middle – G3 to D4
  - Upper Middle – D4 to G4
- Head – G4 to C5
- Falsetto – C5 to G5

Miller describes the lower middle voice as being made up of a mixture of predominantly chest voice with a small amount of head voice. The upper middle he describes as a mixture of predominantly head voice with a small amount of chest voice. This concept holds true for all voice types both male and female. Men have 3 registers separated by 2 passaggi. Each register’s image and shape can be expressed with the shape of a V. (3 V’s, or a double hour glass are acceptable images). Men have 2 passaggi for open vowels and one passaggio for closed vowels. Tenor voices are the highest of the male voice types, with the exception of the countertenor voice, which makes much greater use of the falsetto register. Baritones are the next highest voice after tenors, and they are followed by bass-baritones, and then basses. As a result of their lower voices, the ranges for these parts will be lower than that of the ranges listed for tenor above.

=== Female voices ===
The register ranges for a "generic soprano voice", as given by Richard Miller in Training Soprano Voices, are as follows:

- Chest – G3 to E♭4
- Middle (or mixed) – E♭4 to F♯5
  - Lower Middle – E♭4 to C♯5
  - Upper Middle – C♯5 to F♯5
- Head – F♯5 to C6 or C♯6
- Flageolet – D6 or D♯6 to the "highest negotiable pitches"

The register ranges for a mezzo-soprano voice are as follows:

- Chest – E3 or F3 to E4 or F4
- Middle (or mixed) – C4 to E5 or F5
  - Lower Middle – C4 to B♭4 or B4
  - Upper Middle – B4 to E5 or F5
- Head – F5 or F♯5 to B♭5 or B5
- Flageolet – B5 or C6 and up

The register ranges for a contralto voice are as follows:

- Chest – D3 to G4 or A♭4
- Middle (or mixed) – F4 to D5
  - Lower Middle – F4 to A4
  - Upper Middle – B♭4 to D5
- Head – E♭5 to A♭5
- Flageolet – A5 and up

The difference between ranges for different female voice types are relatively small, but it is these small differences that often determine a singer's voice type. There are some areas where the registers appear to overlap. The notes in these areas can be sung in either the chest voice or the middle voice, depending on the singer. This requires training and control. It is better to sing these notes with a mixture of chest voice and head voice. Bringing the chest voice up too far can be damaging to a higher voice. Where the main register changes occur are the notes of the passaggi.

=== Voice types and passaggi ===
The transitions between the registers are known as the passaggi in classical singing. There are several other common names for the passaggio. "Lift" is a word used in some schools of voice training to describe the passaggio. One of the most common terms for the passaggio is the "break." Marilee David in her book The New Voice Pedagogy explains, "The area where the voice must change registers are often called breaks because the untrained voice appears to break into a new type of production. This break is a sudden gap in sound which occurs when the thyroarytenoid muscles suddenly decrease their activity and the cricothyroid muscles begin to function. A skillful transition of this muscular activity is one of the marks of the trained singer." David does a wonderful job describing the science behind passaggio; however, the term "break", while used frequently during commercial styles of singing, such as pop, rock, country, etc., is usually avoided in classical training. As Miller states, "Register terminology should be carefully chosen. 'Breaks' and 'lifts' may well refer to existing register phenomena in a voice, but psychologically, they tend to point up the division between registers rather than their unification."

Lucero et al. have proposed another theory for the production of voice breaks in terms of the acoustic interaction between the vocal fold oscillation and the vocal tract resonances (formant). The interaction may cause frequency and amplitude jumps when the fundamental frequency of the oscillation or a harmonics crosses through a formant. The occurrence of such jumps depends on the cross-sectional area of the epilarynx, which couples the larynx to the downstream vocal tract, and is facilitated by a narrower area.

Voice Specialist Ingo Titze explains, "Register changes may occur voluntarily or involuntarily." For all singers, mainly classical, negotiating the passaggi can be difficult and can take years to learn how to accomplish well. Classical voice training aims to provide the singer with the tools necessary to move through the passaggi so that the transition between registers sounds seamless and will be unrecognizable to the audience. In his many books on developing the different male and female voice types, Richard Miller gives many exercises for developing the registers and the transitions between them.

==== Male voices ====
In Richard Miller's The Structure of Singing: System and Art in Vocal Technique, Miller identifies the male vocal passaggi as follows:

1. The primo passaggio
2. The secondo passaggio
3. The zona di passaggio

The primo passaggio is the first register transition. In the male voice, Miller indicates that this passaggio occurs between the lower middle register, which is a mixture of predominantly chest voice and some head voice, and the upper middle register, which is a mixture of predominantly head voice and some chest voice. The primo passaggio is not agreed upon by all voice specialists. As James Stark notes in Bel Canto: A History of Vocal Pedagogy, "Richard Miller, who visited numerous Italian voice studios, describes male voices as having a primo passaggio and a secondo passaggio, with a zona di passaggio between them. However, he cites not published literature regarding this theory, and most written sources discuss only one passaggio in male voices... and two passaggi in females (one between chest and middle, and one between middle and head registers)." While the number of passaggi in men appears up for debate, most everyone seems to agree on the existence of at least one passaggio. The most often discussed passaggio in published works is what Miller calls the secondo passaggio, which lies between the upper middle voice and the head voice. Because of the discrepancy surrounding the primo passaggio, Miller's zona di passaggio is also up for debate. Miller describes the zona di passaggio as the area between the primo passaggio and the secondo passaggio, which he says is an area that needs to be negotiated carefully.

Here are the passaggi for tenor voices, as proposed by Miller:

- Tenorino:
  - Primo passaggio – E4
  - Secondo passaggio – A4
- Tenore leggiero (tenore di grazia):
  - Primo passaggio – E♭4
  - Secondo passaggio – A♭4
- Spieltenor:
  - Primo passaggio – E♭4 or D4
  - Secondo passaggio – A♭4 or G4
- Tenore lirico:
  - Primo passaggio – D4
  - Secondo passaggio – G4
- Tenore lirico spinto:
  - Primo passaggio – C♯4
  - Secondo passaggio – F♯4
- Tenore robusto, tenore drammatico:
  - Primo passaggio – C4
  - Secondo passaggio – F4
- Heldentenor:
  - Primo passaggio – C4
  - Secondo passaggio – F4

Here are the passaggi for baritone, bass-baritone, and bass voices, as proposed by Miller:

- Lyric baritone:
  - Primo passaggio – B3
  - Secondo passaggio – E4
- Dramatic (Verdi) baritone:
  - Primo passaggio – B♭3
  - Secondo passaggio – E♭4
- Bass-baritone:
  - Primo passaggio – A3
  - Secondo passaggio – D4
- Lyric bass:
  - Primo passaggio – A♭3
  - Secondo passaggio – D♭4
- Basso profondo:
  - Primo passaggio – G3
  - Secondo passaggio – C4

==== Female voices ====
In the same book, The Structure of Singing: System and Art in Vocal Technique, Miller identifies the female vocal passaggi as follows:

1. The primo passaggio
2. The secondo passaggio

Unlike the male passaggi, the two female passaggi are widely agreed upon. In his book The Structure of Singing: System and Art in Vocal Technique, Miller also posits, "Many sopranos experience an additional pivotal point midway in the long middle register around C-sharp5 with lower-middle register lying below that pitch, and upper-middle register lying above it."

Here are the passaggi for female voices, as proposed by Miller:

- Soprano:
  - Primo passaggio – E♭4
  - Secondo passaggio – F♯5
- Mezzo-soprano:
  - Primo passaggio – E4
  - Secondo passaggio – E5 or F5
- Contralto:
  - Primo passaggio – G♯4 or A4
  - Secondo passaggio – D5
