= Vocal weight =

The "dramatics" or "heaviness" of a voice as considered in voice classifications

Vocal weight refers to the perceived "lightness" or "heaviness" of a singing voice. This quality of the voice is one of the major determining factors in voice classification within classical music. Lighter voices are often associated with the term "lyric" and are usually brighter and more agile; heavier voices are often associated with the term "dramatic" and are usually powerful, rich, and darker. Other voice types like the spinto have a more medium vocal weight. Vocal weight can also affect overall vocal agility; heavier voices often have more difficulty maneuvering through florid coloratura passages than their lighter counterparts, as their weight and power compromises agility. Likewise, dramatic roles are often written with larger orchestras in mind as dramatic voices can carry more easily over larger ensembles.

== See also ==
- Fach
- Voice type
- Singing
- Music
