= Whistle register =

Highest register of the human voice

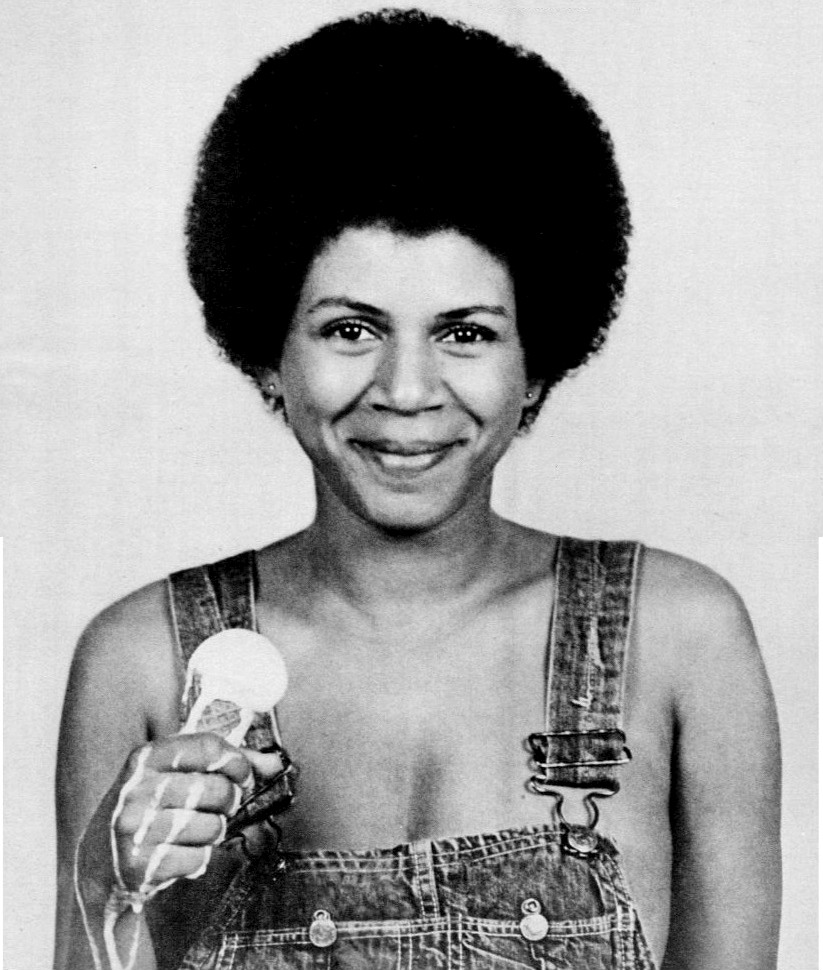
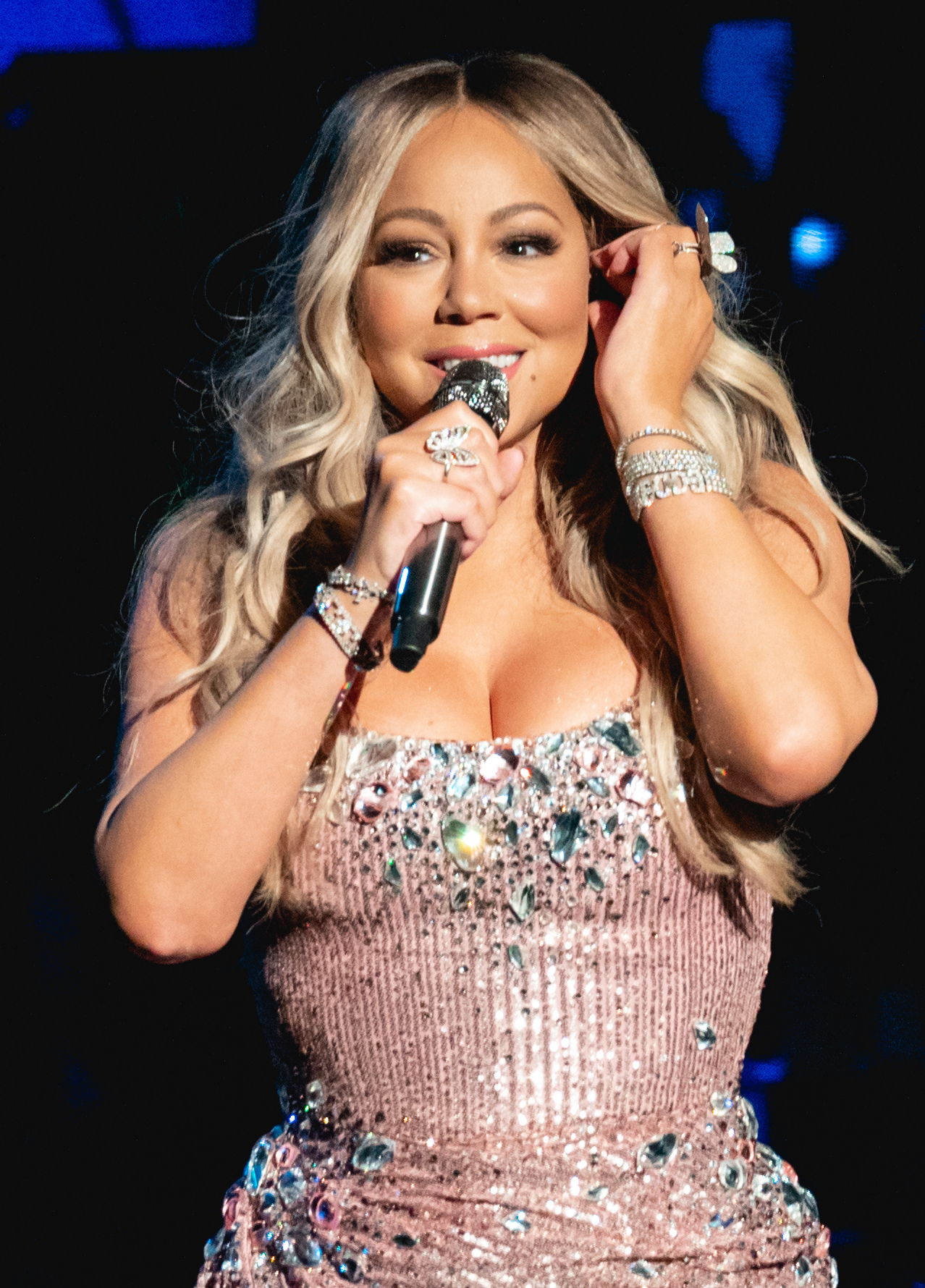
Minnie Riperton (left) had one of the earliest hit records using the whistle register on "Lovin' You" while Mariah Carey (right) uses the technique extensively in her music, most notably with "Emotions".

The whistle register (also called the flute register or flageolet register) is the highest register of the human voice, lying above the modal register and falsetto register. This register has a specific physiological production that is different from the other registers and is so called because the timbre of the notes that are produced from this register is similar to that of a whistle.

For some sopranos, the modal register vocal-production (the high head-voice part) may extend into what is usually thought to be the whistle register.

== Physiology and definition ==
The whistle register is the highest phonational register, which in most singers begins above the soprano "high D" (D_{6} or 1174.6 Hz) and extends to about an octave above (D_{7} or 2349.3 Hz). It is created by using only the back of the vocal folds. The lower part of the whistle register may overlap the upper parts of the modal and falsetto registers, making it possible for singers to phonate these notes in different ways. However, fundamentally, the whistle register is most commonly used to produce pitches above D_{6}. As with the other vocal registers, the whistle register does not begin at the same point within every voice, and there are rare voices that can extend the whistle register much higher or lower than the range listed above. For example, most operatic coloratura sopranos can sing up to the "high" F above "high" C without entering into the whistle register.

The physiology of the whistle register is the least understood of the vocal registers. Unlike other types of vocal production, it is difficult to film the vocal cords while they are operating in this manner as the epiglottis closes down over the larynx, and the resonating chamber assumes its smallest dimensions. It is known that when producing pitches in this register, vibration occurs only in some anterior portion of the vocal folds. This shorter vibrating length naturally allows for easier production of high pitches.

Although the whole physiological production of whistle tone is not understood, it is known that while the lateral cricoarytenoid muscles are active, the transverse arytenoid muscles remain inactive; a triangular opening is seen between the arytenoids, the vocal processes contact each other, and the posterior parts at the apex do not contact each other. The exception to this would be if the vocal folds are not stretched, as stretching of the vocal ligaments abducts (moves away from) the vocal processes.

== Use in music ==
In popular music, the whistle register is used with more variety and to produce much higher pitches than are called for in classical music. It has mostly been used by female singers, with notable examples being Minnie Riperton, Betty Wright, Mariah Carey, Christina Aguilera, Ariana Grande.

Some male singers can also make use of the whistle register, including Vitas, Adam Lopez, Axl Rose and Dimash Qudaibergen.
