= Vocal fry register =

Human vocal register

Short demonstration of vocal fry

Another demonstration of vocal fry

The vocal fry register (Note: Also known as pulse register, laryngealization, pulse phonation, creaky voice, creak, croak, popcorning, glottal fry, glottal rattle, glottal scrape, and comfortable voice register.) is the lowest vocal register and is produced through a loose glottal closure that permits air to bubble through slowly with a popping or rattling sound of a very low frequency. During this phonation, the arytenoid cartilages in the larynx are drawn together, which causes the vocal folds to compress rather tightly and become relatively slack and compact. This process forms a large and irregularly vibrating mass within the vocal folds that produces the characteristic low popping or rattling sound when air passes through the glottal closure. The register (if well-controlled) can extend far below the modal voice register, in some cases up to 8 octaves lower, such as in the case of Tim Storms who holds the world record for lowest frequency note ever produced by a human, a G_{−7}, which is only 0.189 Hz, inaudible to the human ear.

Vocal fry is thought to have become more common among young female speakers of American English in the 21st century, with the style of speaking being considered informal, nonaggressive and urban-oriented.

== History of register classification ==
The vocal fry register has been a recognized and identifiable register in American English only within the past few decades, but its characteristic sound was recognized much earlier. Discussion of the vocal fry or pulse register began first within the field of phonetics and speech therapy and did not enter the vocabulary of vocal music pedagogists until the early 1970s, when it was initially controversial. However, controversy surrounding the term within vocal music subsided as more research into the use of the vocal fry register within the context of singing ensued. In particular, vocal pedagogist Margaret Greene's videotaping of the physiological processes occurring in the body while singers were phonating in the vocal fry register offered solid evidence that this type of vocal phonation should be considered a vocal register from the perspectives of both speech pathology and vocal music. Like any other vocal register, the vocal fry register has a unique vibratory pattern of the vocal folds, a certain series of pitches, and a certain type of sound that distinguishes it from other vocal registers.

== In speech ==
Discussion of vocal fry is much more frequent in books related to phonetics and speech therapy than it is in those dealing with singing. Some authorities consider the use of vocal fry in speech a dysphonia, but others consider it so only if it is used excessively, such as Hollien, Moore, Wendahl, and Michel:

It is simply our intent to suggest that ordinarily vocal fry constitutes one of several physiologically available types of voice production on the frequency-pitch continuum and hence, of itself, is not logically classified among the laryngeal pathologies. While the excessive use of fry could result in a diagnosis of voice disorder, this quality is too often heard in normal voices (especially in descending inflections where the voice fundamentally falls below frequencies in the modal register) to be exclusively a disorder.

Many are quick to point out that although vocal fry is minimally a part of routine speaking patterns, the continued use of such a pattern makes it non-utilitarian or pathological.

Pathé news reel where the speaker uses vocal fry termination (1932)

During the 20th century, vocal fry in English was most commonly associated to intonational falls produced by male speakers of Received Pronunciation. Notable examples are the movie characters James Bond as played by Sean Connery, and Shere Khan voiced by the actor George Sanders who turned creaky voice into his trademark.

Some evidence exists of vocal fry becoming more common in the speech of young female speakers of American English in the early 21st century, but its frequency's extent and significance are disputed. Researcher Ikuko Patricia Yuasa suggests that the tendency is a product of young women trying to infuse their speech with gravitas by means of reaching for the male register and found that "college-age Americans ... perceive female creaky voice as hesitant, nonaggressive, and informal but also educated, urban-oriented, and upwardly mobile."

In native speakers of American English, young women use vocal fry more frequently than men. When asked to read a passage, female speakers used vocal fry at a rate four times higher than male speakers.

Creaky voice is frequent in a number of languages, including Finnish, where it serves as a cue for phrase-boundaries and turn-taking. Some languages, such as Jalapa Mazatec, use vocal fry (creaky voice) as a linguistically significant marker; the presence or absence of vocal fry can then change the meaning of a word.

=== Social implications ===
Some people seek out the help of speech pathologists as they feel vocal fry makes them appear unsure and less confident.

A study published in 2014 found that speech with vocal fry was perceived more negatively than a voice without vocal fry, particularly in a labor market context. Young adult women using vocal fry were perceived as sounding "less competent, less educated, less trustworthy, less attractive, and less hirable". The negative evaluation was stronger when the evaluator was also a woman. A limitation of the study was that the vocal fry samples were produced by imitators rather than natural vocal fry speakers. The study was criticised by the linguist Rusty Barrett as the recordings used as stimuli were of participants imitating vocal fry, rather than of speakers who use it in their normal speaking voice. That suggests that more research is needed, as the negative reaction could be attributable to other factors. Some have argued that negative perceptions are part of a broad attack on women's speech, noting how male voices with vocal fry carry different, and sometimes opposite, connotations.

In Finnish language, creaky voice is an integrated part of the pronunciation and is used regardless of gender. A study from Finland showed that the absence of voice fry in spoken Finnish was perceived as the speaker being less fluent.

== In singing ==
The croaking sound produced by male singers at the start of phrases in American country music is produced by moving from this to the modal register. Within choral music, when true basses are not available, choirs often rely on singers who can "fry" the low bass notes. Singers such as Tim Storms, Mike Holcomb and various other gospel basses use this technique to sing very low tones. Some styles of folk singing showcase the vocal fry register in the female voice.

The chief use of the vocal fry register in singing is to obtain pitches of very low frequency, which are not available to the singer in the modal register. The physiological production of the vocal fry register may be extended up into the modal register. In some cases, vocal pedagogues have found the use of vocal fry therapeutically helpful to students who have trouble producing lower notes. Singers often lose their low notes or never learn to produce them because of the excessive tension of the laryngeal muscles and support mechanism that leads to too much breath pressure.

Some throat singing styles such as kargyraa, which includes overtone singing, use vocal techniques similar to vocal fry.

== In popular culture ==
The vocal fry register – either singing or speaking – is heard from many female celebrities of the 21st century, including Ariana Grande, Britney Spears, Emma Stone, Katy Perry, Kesha, Kim Kardashian, and Lady Gaga.

== See also ==
- Basso profondo
- Breathy voice
- Creaky voice
- High rising terminal
- Sexy baby voice
- Slack voice
- T-glottalization
- Uptalk
- Valleyspeak

== Sources ==
- Cooper, Morton (1973). Modern Techniques of Vocal Rehabilitation. Charles C. Thomas. ASIN B000JC1U76.
- Greene, Margaret; Lesley Mathieson (2001). The Voice and its Disorders. John Wiley & Sons; 6th Edition. ISBN 978-1-86156-196-1.
- Large, John (February–March 1972). "Towards an Integrated Physiologic-Acoustic Theory of Vocal Registers". The NATS Bulletin. 28: 30–35.
- McKinney, James (1994). The Diagnosis and Correction of Vocal Faults. Genovex Music Group. ISBN 978-1-56593-940-0.
- Kallio, Heini; Suviranta, Rosa; Kuronen, Mikko; Zansen, Anna von (May 2022). Creaky voice and utterance fluency measures in predicting perceived fluency and oral proficiency of spontaneous L2 Finnish. Speech Prosody 2022. Lissabon, Portugal.
