= Tessitura =

Comfortable pitch range for a singer or musical instrument

In music, tessitura (English: /ˌtɛsɪˈtʊərə/ TESS-ih-TOOR-ə, UK also /-ˈtjʊər-/ -TURE-, Italian: [tessiˈtuːra]; pl. tessiture; lit. 'weaving' or 'texture') is the most acceptable and comfortable vocal range for a given singer (or, less frequently, musical instrument). It is the range in which a given type of voice presents its best-sounding (or characteristic) timbre. This broad definition is often interpreted to refer specifically to the pitch range that most frequently occurs within a given part of a musical piece. Hence, in musical notation, tessitura is the ambitus, or a narrower part of it, in which that particular vocal (or less often instrumental) part lies—whether high or low, etc.

However, the tessitura of a part or voice is not decided by the extremes of its range, but rather by the share of this total range which is most used. Hence, it is referred to as the "heart" of a range. For example, throughout the entirety of Wagner's Ring, the music written for the tenor role of Siegfried ranges from C♯_{3} to C_{5}, but the tessitura is described as high because the phrases are most often in the range of C_{4} to A_{4}.

Furthermore, the tessitura concept addresses not merely a range of pitches but also the arrangement of those pitches. The particular melodic contour of a singer's part may also be considered to be an important aspect of their vocal tessitura. Tessitura considerations include these factors: proportion of sudden or gradual rises and falls in pitch—speed of pitch changes; the relative number of very high or low notes; whether lines and phrases of music in the piece tend to rise or fall—the muscular abilities of a singer may be more suited to one or the other direction. A singer's ideal tessitura is centered on the single pitch in which their dynamic range is greatest.

The extension to the more particular "weaving" of a voice has led to a commixture of tessitura and voice type. For example, the volume (loudness) that a singer is able to maintain for dramatic effect will often influence which Fach (voice type) or tessitura they specialize in. For example, a lyric tenor may have the vocal range to sing Wagner or other dramatic roles, but to maintain the loudness required for dramatic intensity over the span of an opera performance could either inflict vocal damage or be beyond his ability.

== See also ==
- Extension (music)
- Register
