= Modal voice =

Vocal register associated with speech and singing

Modal voice is the vocal register used most frequently in speech and singing in most languages. It is also the linguistic term for the most common phonation of vowels. The term "modal" refers to the resonant mode of vocal folds. It is characterized by balanced airflow and glottal tension to produce maximum vibration.

== Linguistic phonation ==
In linguistics, modal voice is the only phonation found in the vowels and other sonorants (consonants such as m, n, l, and r) of most of the languages of the world, but a significant minority contrasts modal voice with other phonations. Among obstruents (consonants such as k, g, t͡ʃ/ch, d͡ʒ/j, s, and z), it is very common for languages to contrast modal voice with voicelessness, but in English, many supposedly-voiced obstruents do not usually have modal voice.

In speech pathology, the modal register is one of the four identifiable registers within the human voice. It is above the vocal fry register and overlapping the lower part of the falsetto register. That view is also adopted by some vocal pedagogists, but some vocal pedagogists may view vocal registration differently. In singing, the modal register may also overlap part of the whistle register. A well trained singer or speaker can phonate two octaves or more within the modal register with consistent production, tone, dynamic variation, and vocal freedom. The modal register begins and ends in different places within the human voice. The placement of the modal register within the individual human voice is one of the key determining factors in identifying vocal type.

== Physiological process ==
In the modal register, the length, tension, and mass of the vocal folds are in a state of flux which causes the frequency of vibration of the vocal folds to vary. As the tension of the vocal folds is increased, causing them to lengthen and their edges to become thinner, the pitch of the resultant vocalisation rises. If any of the three factors were to be held constant, interfering with the progressive state of change, the laryngeal function of the voice would become static and, eventually, breaks would occur, resulting in obvious changes in vocal quality.

While some vocal pedagogists identify such breaks as register boundaries or transition areas between registers, other vocal pedagogists maintain that the breaks are a result of vocal problems caused by a static laryngeal adjustment that does not permit the necessary changes to take place within the modal register.

Vocal fold, scheme

Glottal cycle, modal voice

On the lower pitches in the modal register, the vocal folds are thick and wedge-shaped. Because of the thickness, large portions of the opposing surfaces of the vocal folds are brought into contact, and the glottis remains closed for a considerable time in each cycle. The glottis opens from the bottom before it opens at the top, which imparts a fluid, wavelike motion to the cords. The modal voice has a broad harmonic spectrum, rich in overtones, because of the rolling motion of the cords. It is comparatively loud to the other vocal registers because of the vibratory energy present, but it is capable of dynamic variation.

For the lowest tones, only the thyroarytenoid muscles are active, but as the pitch rises, the cricothyroids enter the action, which begins to lengthen the folds. As longitudinal tension increases, the glottis tends to develop a gap in the middle. To counteract the tendency, the lateral cricoarytenoids are brought into action, pulling forward on the muscular process of the arytenoids. The process is sometimes referred to as medial compression.

In addition to the stretching of the vocal folds and the increased tension as the pitch rises, the opposing surfaces of the folds, which may be brought into contact, become smaller and smaller, as the edges of the folds become thinner. The basic vibratory or phonatory pattern remains the same, with the whole vocal fold active, but the vertical excursions are not as large and the rolling motion is not as apparent as on the lower pitches of the modal register.

The physical limits of muscular strength of the internal thyroarytenoids or vocalis muscle are being approached. To sing or speak above this pitch level, the voice must adopt a new phonatory pattern to change registers.

== See also ==
- Voice (phonetics)

== Sources ==
- Cooper, Morton (1973). Modern Techniques of Vocal Rehabilitation. Charles C. Thomas. ASIN B000JC1U76.
