= Vocal resonation =

Aspect of human sound production

Vocal resonance may be defined as "the process by which the basic product of phonation is enhanced in timbre and/or intensity by the air-filled cavities through which it passes on its way to the outside air." Throughout the vocal literature, various terms related to resonation are used, including: amplification, filtering, enrichment, enlargement, improvement, intensification, and prolongation. Acoustic authorities would question many of these terms from a strictly scientific perspective. However, the main point to be drawn from these terms by a singer or speaker is that the result of resonation is to make a better sound, or at least suitable to a certain esthetical and practical domain.

== Human resonating chambers ==
The voice, like all acoustic instruments such as the guitar, trumpet, piano, or violin, has its own special chambers for resonating the tone. Once the tone is produced by the vibrating vocal cords, it vibrates in and through the open resonating ducts and chambers. Since the vocal tract is often associated with different regions of the body, different resonance chambers might be referred to as: chest, mouth, nose/"mask", or head.

In a more symbolic/perceptual way, rather than physical, the various terms applied can represent vocal "colors" in a continuous scale: from dark (chest) resonance to bright (head-nasal) resonance. We may call this spectrum a resonance track. In the lower range, the chest/dark color predominates; in the middle range, the mouth-nasal resonance is dominant; and in the higher range, the head-nasal resonance (bright color) predominates. The objective of using such images by several teachers and coaches is to achieve command of all the "colors of the spectrum". That, ultimately, may allow a greater scope of emotional expression. The emotional content of the lyric or phrase suggests the color and volume of the tone and is the personal choice of the artist.

- Head resonance should not be confused with head register or falsetto. It is used primarily for softer singing in either register throughout the range.
- Mouth resonance is used for a conversational vocal color in singing and, in combination with nasal resonance, it creates forward placement or mask resonance.
- Chest resonance adds richer, darker, and deeper tone coloring for a sense of power, warmth, and sensuality. It creates a feeling of depth and drama in the voice.
- Nasal (mask resonance) is present at all times in a well-produced tone, except perhaps in pure head tone or at very soft volume. Nasal resonance is bright and edgy and is used in combination with mouth resonance to create forward placement (mask resonance). In an overall sense, it adds overtones that give clarity and projection to the voice.

There are some singers who are recognized by their pronounced nasal quality; whereas others are noted for their deep, dark, and chesty sound; and still others are noted for their breathy or heady sound; and so on. In part, such individuality depends on the structure of the singer's vocal instrument, that is, the inherent shape and size of the vocal cords and of the vocal tract.

The quality or color of a voice also depends on the singer's ability to develop and use various resonances by controlling the shape and size of the chambers through which the sound flows. It has been demonstrated electrographically in the form of "voice-prints" that, like fingerprints, no two voices are exactly alike.

== Sympathetic and forced vibration ==
In a technical sense, resonance is a relationship that exists between two bodies vibrating at the same frequency or a multiple thereof. In other words, the vibrations emanating from one body cause the other body to start vibrating in tune with it. A resonator may be defined as a secondary vibrator which is set into motion by the main vibrator and which adds its own characteristics to the generated sound waves.

There are two kinds of resonance: sympathetic resonance (or free resonance) and forced resonance (or conductive resonance) The essential difference between both types is what causes the resonator to start vibrating. In sympathetic resonance, there is no need of a direct physical contact between the two bodies. The resonator starts functioning because it receives vibrations through the air and responds to them sympathetically, as long as the resonator's natural frequencies of vibration coincide with the exciting oscillations. In forced resonance, the resonator starts vibrating because it is in physical contact with a vibrating body, which "forces" the resonator to replicate its oscillations.

Both types of resonance are at work in the human voice during speaking and singing. Much of the vibration felt by singers while singing is a result of forced resonance. The waves originated by the airflow modulated by the vibrating vocal folds travel along the bones, cartilages, and muscles of the neck, head, and upper chest, causing them to vibrate by forced resonance. There is little evidence that these vibrations, sensed by tactile nerves, make any significant contribution to the external sound.

These same forced vibrations, however, may serve as sensation guides for the singer, regardless of their effect on the external sound. These sensations may provide evidence to the singer that their vocal folds are forming strong primary vibrations which are being carried from them to the head and chest. Thus these vibratory sensations can supply sensory feedback about the efficiency of the whole phonatory process to the singer.

In contrast, the sound a person hears from a singer is a product of sympathetic resonance. Air vibrations generated at the level of the vocal folds in the larynx propagate through the vocal tract (e.g., the ducts and cavities of the airways). In other words, the voice's resultant glottal wave is filtered by the vocal tract: a phenomenon of sympathetic resonance. The vocal resonator is not a sounding board comparable with stringed instruments. Rather, it's a column of air traveling through the vocal tract, with a shape that is not only complex, but highly variable. Vennard says:

Thus it may vibrate as a whole or in any of its parts. It should not be too hard to think of it as vibrating several ways at once. Indeed most vibrators do this, otherwise we would not have timbre, which consists of several frequencies of different intensities sounding together. Air is fully as capable of this as any other medium; indeed, the sounds of many diverse instruments are carried to the ear by the same air, are funnelled into the same tiny channel, and can still be heard as one sound or as sounds from the individual sources, depending upon the manner in which we give attention.

== Factors affecting resonators ==
There are a number of factors which determine the resonance characteristics of a resonator. Included among them are the following: size, shape, type of opening, composition and thickness of the walls, surface, and combined resonators. The quality of a sound can be appreciably changed by rather small variations in these conditioning factors.

In general, the larger a resonator is, the lower the frequency it will respond to; the greater the volume of air, the lower its pitch. But the pitch also will be affected by the shape of resonator and by the size of opening and amount of lip or neck the resonator has.

A conical shaped resonator, such as a megaphone, tends to amplify all pitches indiscriminately. A cylindrical shaped resonator is affected primarily by the length of the tube through which the sound wave travels. A spherical resonator will be affected by the amount of opening it has and by whether or not that opening has a lip.

Three factors relating to the walls of a resonator will affect how it functions: the material it is made of, the thickness of its walls, and the type of surface it has. The resonance characteristics of a musical instrument obviously will vary with different materials and the amount of material used will have some effect.

Of special importance to singing is the relationship of the surface of a resonator to its tonal characteristics. Resonators can be highly selective, meaning that they will respond to only one frequency (or multiples of it), or they can be universal, meaning that they can respond to a broad range of frequencies. In general, the harder the surface of the resonator, the more selective it will be, and the softer the surface, the more universal it will become. "[A] hard resonator will respond only when the vibrator contains an overtone that is exactly in tune with the resonator, while a soft resonator permits a wide range of fundamentals to pass through un-dampened but adds its own frequency as on overtone, harmonic or inharmonic as the case may be."

Hardness carried to the extreme will result in a penetrating tone with a few very strong high partials. Softness carried to the extreme will result in a mushy, non-directional tone of little character. Between these two extremes lies a whole gamut of tonal possibilities.

The final factor to be mentioned is the effect of joining two or more resonators together. In general, the effect of joining two or more resonators is that the resonant frequency of each is lowered in different proportions according to their capacities, their orifices, and so forth. The rules governing combined resonators apply to the human voice: for the throat, mouth and sometimes the nose all function in this manner.

== The vocal resonators in detail ==
Chest anatomy

There are seven areas that may be listed as possible vocal resonators. In sequence from the lowest within the body to the highest, these areas are the chest, the tracheal tree, the larynx itself, the pharynx, the oral cavity, the nasal cavity, and the sinuses.

=== The chest ===
The chest is not an effective resonator, despite numerous voice books and teachers referring to “chest resonance”. Although strong vibratory sensations may be experienced in the upper chest, it can make no significant contribution to the resonance system of the voice, simply by virtue of its structure and location. The chest is mostly connected to the upstream structures of the airways, such as the lungs and trachea (e.g., under the vocal folds). There, it has a high degree of vibrational absorption, with little or no acoustical function to reflect sound waves back toward the larynx.

=== The tracheal tree ===
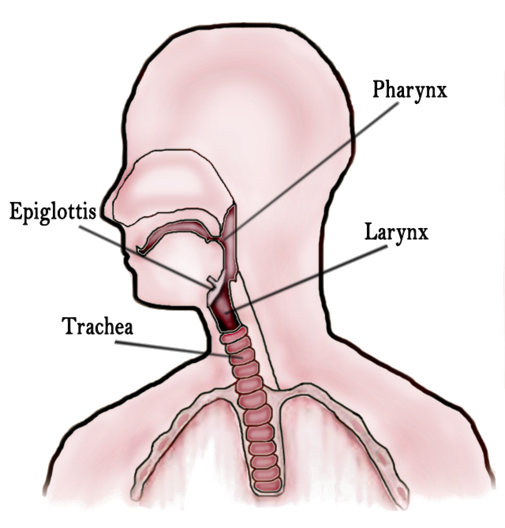
throat diagram

The tracheal tree makes no significant contribution to the resonance system, except for a negative effect around its resonant frequency. The trachea and the bronchial tubes combine to form an inverted Y-shaped structure known as the tracheal tree. It lies just below the larynx, and, unlike the interior of the lungs, has a definite tubular shape and comparatively hard surfaces. The response of the tracheal tree is the same for all pitches except for its own resonant frequency. When this resonant frequency is reached, the response of the subglottic tube is to act as an acoustical impedance or interference which tends to upset the phonatory function of the larynx. Research has placed the resonant frequency of the subglottal system or tracheal tree around the E-flat above "middle C" for both men and women, varying somewhat with the size of the individual.

=== The larynx ===
Due to its small size, the larynx acts as a resonator only for high frequencies. Research indicates that one of the desirable attributes of good vocal tone is a prominent overtone lying between 2800 and 3200 hertz, with male voices nearer the lower limit and female voices nearer the upper. This attribute is identified as brilliance, or more frequently as ring or the singer's formant, as fully described by Sundberg. There are several areas in or adjacent to the larynx which might resonate such a high pitch. Among them are the collar of the larynx, the ventricles of Morgagni, the vallecula, and the pyriform sinuses. The larynx is not under conscious control, but whatever produces "ring" can be encouraged indirectly by awareness on the part of the student and the teacher of the sounds which contain it.

=== The pharynx ===
The pharynx is the most important resonator by virtue of its position, size, and degree of adjustability. It is the first cavity of any size through which the product of the laryngeal vibrator passes; the other supraglottal cavities have to accept whatever the pharynx passes on to them. Greene states:

"The supraglottic resonators being in the main muscular and moveable structures must be voluntarily controlled to produce conditions of optimal resonance either by varying degrees of tension in their walls, or by alterations in the size of their orifices and cavities during the articulatory movements."

=== The oral cavity ===
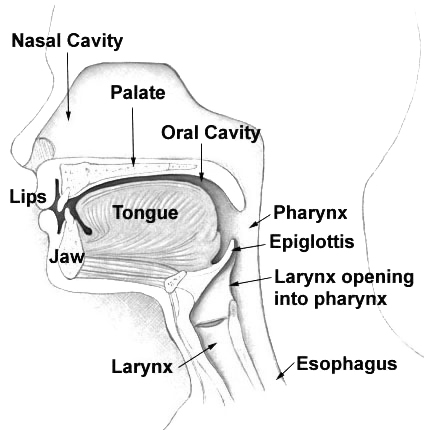

The oral cavity is the second most effective resonator. The shape and placement of the tongue drastically changes the shape of this resonator. The size of the resonator is also decided by the jaw's degree of opening or closing of the mouth. Finally, the lips shape a final filter on the sound, completing the final step of the "oral resonance."

=== The nasal cavity ===
The nasal cavity is the third most effective resonator.

=== The sinuses ===
In spite of being traditionally referred to as resonators by many singers and teachers, the sinuses consist of small closed air pockets, not acoustically connected to the vocal tract, and with no proven role in voice resonance. One could argue that head surface and deeper nerves close to the sinuses may detect passive vibrations entailed by the voice generated and transmitted across the vocal tract. These sensations might support the preservation of the image of the sinuses as effective resonators.
