= Helge Rosvaenge =

German opera singer

Helge Rosvaenge (born Helge Anton Rosenvinge Hansen, 29 August 1897 – 17 June 1972) was a Danish-born operatic tenor whose career was centred on Germany and Austria, before, during and after World War II. His last name is sometimes spelled Roswaenge or Rosvænge.

Rosvaenge was born in Copenhagen. However, his life was spent in Germany, and he made his debut at Neustrelitz as Don Jose in Carmen in 1921. Engagements followed at Altenburg, Basel, Cologne (1927–30) and the Berlin State Opera, where he was leading tenor from 1930 to 1944, being especially distinguished in the Italian repertory. He also sang regularly at the Vienna State Opera from 1936, and in Munich. Rosvaenge also appeared at the Salzburg Festival, making his debut there in Der Rosenkavalier. Other roles which he performed at Salzburg between 1933 and 1939 were Tamino in The Magic Flute, Huon in Oberon and Florestan in Fidelio. His London debut at the Royal Opera House, Covent Garden, occurred in 1938, as Florestan.

He sang Parsifal at the Bayreuth Festival in 1934 and 1936, but otherwise the Wagnerian repertory was mostly on recordings.

He also appeared in films, such as Verlieb' dich nicht am Bodensee (1935) and Last Rose (1936).

After World War II, Rosvaenge divided his time between Berlin and Vienna. He continued to sing until 30 May 1959 (when he gave what was billed as his farewell concert at Vienna's Great Musikvereinssaal), singing arias from Turandot as Calàf, Aida as Radamès and Il trovatore as Manrico. His voice showed little sign of age; it was still warm and sonorous throughout its range, and brilliant and lustrous in its upper register. Indeed, he could produce an easy and full-blooded high D during his vocal prime. This can be heard in one of his most celebrated recordings, the Postillon's Song ("Mes amis, écoutez l'histoire") from Le postillon de Lonjumeau by Adolphe Adam.

Rosvaenge appeared in a wide spectrum of roles ranging from Mozart to Weber, from Verdi to Puccini. He sang with "a steely voice, brilliant high notes and insistent declamation throughout its scale" which was "brilliant and lustrous in its top register", according to Luiz Eduardo Goncalves Gabarra. He was equally impressive as Andrea Chénier and was also an acclaimed and exciting Radamès and Otello, in which latter role he was often heard on German radio.

He toured the US before retiring, and died in Munich at 74.

== Repertoire ==
Repertorio operistico
Ruolo	Titolo	Autore
Chapelou	Le postillon de Lonjumeau	Adam
Fra Diavolo; Lorenzo	Fra Diavolo	Auber
Florestan	Fidelio	Beethoven
Énée	Les Troyens	Berlioz
Don José	Carmen	Bizet
Georges Brown	La dame blanche	Boieldieu
Vladimir Igorevich	Prince Igor	Borodin
Don Manuel	Don Gil	Braunfels
Julien	Louise	Charpentier
Nureddin	Der Barbier von Bagdad	Cornelius
Nando	Tiefland	d'Albert
Shepherd	Die toten Augen	d'Albert
Pelléas	Pelléas et Mélisande	Debussy
Nemorino	L'elisir d'amore	Donizetti
Tonio	La fille du régiment	Donizetti
Lionel	Martha	Flotow
Don Martin	Don Gil	Futterer
Andrea Chénier	Andrea Chénier	Giordano
Count Loris Ipanov	Fedora	Giordano
Bogdan Sobinin	A Life for the Tsar	Glinka
Ali	La rencontre imprévue	Gluck
Admeto	Alceste	Gluck
Baron von Kayserling	Adrienne	Goetze
Faust	Faust	Gounod
Prince Léopold	La Juive	Halévy
The courtier	Cardillac	Hindemith
Števa	Jenůfa	Janáček
Felix	Rendez-vous um Mitternacht	Kattnigg
Hein	Der Fremde	Kaun
Primus Thaller	Der Kuhreigen	Kienzl
Italian tenor	Yolimba	Killmayer
Georg	Spuk im Schloss	Křička
Schrenk	Die große Sünderin	Künneke
Prince Sou-Chong	The Land of Smiles	Lehár
Canio	Pagliacci	Leoncavallo
Marquis de Chateauneuf	Zar und Zimmermann	Lortzing
Kronthal	Der Wildschütz	Lortzing
Sylvain	Les dragons de Villars	Maillart
Turiddu	Cavalleria rusticana	Mascagni
Raoul de Nangis	Les Huguenots	Meyerbeer
Vasco de Gama	L'Africaine	Meyerbeer
Symon Rymanowicz	Der Bettelstudent	Millöcker
Bastien	Bastien und Bastienne	Mozart
Contino Belfiore	La finta giardiniera	Mozart
Idomeneo	Idomeneo	Mozart
Belmonte	Die Entführung aus dem Serail	Mozart
Kappelmeister	Der Schauspieldirektor	Mozart
Don Ottavio	Don Giovanni	Mozart
Ferrando	Così fan tutte	Mozart
Tamino	The Magic Flute	Mozart
Fenton	The Merry Wives of Windsor	Nicolai
Orphée	Orpheus in the Underworld	Offenbach
Pâris	La belle Hélène	Offenbach
Falsacappa	Les brigands	Offenbach
Hoffmann	Les contes d'Hoffmann	Offenbach
Abdisu	Palestrina	Pfitzner
Chevalier Renato des Grieux	Manon Lescaut	Puccini
Rodolfo	La bohème	Puccini
Mario Cavaradossi	Tosca	Puccini
Dick Johnson	La fanciulla del West	Puccini
B. F. Pinkerton	Madama Butterfly	Puccini
Pang; Calaf	Turandot	Puccini
Count Almaviva	The Barber of Seville	Rossini
Arnold Melchtal	William Tell	Rossini
Fedja	Iwan Tarassenko	Salmhofer
Astolf	Die Weiberverschwörung	Schubert
Alfred	Die Fledermaus	J. Strauss II
Guido	Eine Nacht in Venedig	J. Strauss II
Sándor Barinkay; Conte Carnero	The Gypsy Baron	J. Strauss II
Suleiman	Tausendundeine Nacht	J. Strauss II
An Italian singer	Der Rosenkavalier	Strauss
The tenor (Bacchus)	Ariadne auf Naxos	Strauss
The Apparition of a Youth	Die Frau ohne Schatten	Strauss
Da-Ud	Die ägyptische Helena	Strauss
Matteo	Arabella	Strauss
Wilhelm Meister	Mignon	Thomas
Duke of Mantua	Rigoletto	Verdi
Manrico	Il trovatore	Verdi
Alfredo Germont	La traviata	Verdi
Arrigo	I vespri siciliani	Verdi
Gabriele Adorno	Simon Boccanegra	Verdi
Gustavo	Un ballo in maschera	Verdi
Don Alvaro	La forza del destino	Verdi
Don Carlo	Don Carlo	Verdi
Radames	Aida	Verdi
Otello	Otello	Verdi
Walther von der Vogelweide	Tannhäuser	Wagner
A young sailor	Tristan und Isolde	Wagner
Balthasar Zorn; Kunz Vogelgesang	Die Meistersinger von Nürnberg	Wagner
Froh	Das Rheingold	Wagner
Parsifal	Parsifal	Wagner
Abu Hassan	Abu Hassan	Weber
Max	Der Freischütz	Weber
Oberon; Hüon	Oberon	Weber
Harald	Königsballade	Wille
Roderick	The Mine Foreman	Zeller

== Recordings ==
Rosvaenge was a prolific recording artist starting as early as 1927, first for the Gramophone Company (now EMI) and later on the Telefunken, Parlophone and Odeon labels. Many of these recordings have been reissued on CD. The finest of them were made in the 1930s and early 1940s.

A recording of his solo tenor singing in a 1938 performance of Verdi's Requiem with the BBC Symphony Orchestra conducted by Arturo Toscanini has been released on CD as well.
