= Albert Bittner =

German conductor {1900–1980)

Albert Bittner (27 September 1900 – 7 August 1980) was a German conductor and Generalmusikdirektor.

== Life ==
Born in Nuremberg, Bittner attended the Realgymnasium and the Hochschule für Musik Nürnberg and completed private music studies with August Scharrer and Richard Lert. He began his career as 2nd Kapellmeister at the Reussisches Theater Gera (1923-1929), which was one of the most "advanced" theatres in the German Reich in the 1920s due to its programme and attracted many prominent artists.

From 1929 to 1932 he was principal répétiteur at the Berlin State Opera and assistant to Otto Klemperer and répétiteur at the Kroll Opera in Berlin. In the 1932/33 season he was subsequently first Kapellmeister at the Graz Opera, where he also joined the National Socialist German Workers' Party (member number 1,517,656). From 1933 he took over the Oldenburgisches Staatstheater as state music director. In 1936 Bittner became Municipal Music Director and musical director of the Opera House in Essen and led the Essen Philharmonic Orchestra. In the Saalbau Essen he premiered, among other works, the 2nd Symphony by Ernst Pepping (7 February 1943). On 19 June 1940, he conducted the Berlin Philharmonic for the first time. There is a photo portrait of Albert Bittner by the photographer Albert Renger-Patzsch in his estate archive, Pinakothek der Moderne, Munich - he can also be seen with his wife in a group photograph of the Essen Musikverein from 1936.

From 1943 until shortly after the end of the war, he was interim "Musical Director" of the Hamburg State Opera. He also conducted the first symphony concerts of the Philharmonisches Staatsorchester Hamburg after World War II.

From 1945 until 1955, he was general music director at the Staatstheater Braunschweig. From 1955 to 1965, he served as Kapellmeister at the Hamburg State Opera. There, he supervised numerous works over several seasons and also conducted La traviata in the Felsenstein production. He also brought out a number of important premieres, including the Irische Legende by Werner Egk, Die Schule der Frauen by Liebermann and Strobel, Dimitrij by Dvořák/Marie Červinková-Riegrová and Die Heimkehr (staged premiere 1955) by Marcel Mihalovici for the first performance.

Bittner continued to guest conduct several opera performances at the State Opera after his retirement. In September 1970, on the occasion of his 70th birthday, he conducted a performance of Mozart's The Magic Flute; this was also his last appearance on the podium of the Hamburg State Opera Orchestra.

He also conducted the German premiere of the opera The Love for Three Oranges (1950) and the world premiere of the opera Die Feuerprobe by Kurt Stiebitz (1953, Staatstheater Braunschweig). As guest conductor, he led among others the Southwest German Radio Symphony Orchestra and the Radio Beromünster Zurich.

After leaving the Hamburg State Opera, he taught at the Hochschule für Musik und Theater Hamburg, where he held a conducting class. His students included Wilhelm Kaiser-Lindemann and Manfred Trojahn.

Bittner died in Hamburg at the age of 79.
