= Nicolai Gedda =

Swedish operatic tenor (1925–2017)

- Nicolai Gedda
- Born: Harry Gustaf Nikolai Gädda; 11 July 1925; Stockholm, Sweden
- Died: 8 January 2017 (aged 91); Tolochenaz, Switzerland
- Occupation: Operatic tenor

Harry Gustaf Nikolai Gädda, better known as Nicolai Gedda (11 July 1925 – 8 January 2017), was a Swedish operatic tenor. Debuting in 1951, Gedda had a long and successful career in opera until the age of 77 in June 2003, when he made his final operatic recording. Skilled at languages, he performed operas in French, Russian, German, Italian, English, Czech and Swedish, as well as one in Latin. In January 1958, he created the role of Anatol in the world premiere of Samuel Barber's Vanessa at the Metropolitan Opera. Having made some two hundred recordings, Gedda is one of the most widely recorded opera singers in history. His singing is best known for its beauty of tone, vocal control, and musical perception.

== Early years ==
Gädda, who later changed the spelling of his surname to Gedda, was born out of wedlock in Stockholm to a Swedish mother and a half-Russian father. He was raised by his aunt Olga Gädda and his adoptive father Michail Ustinov (a distant relative of Peter Ustinov), who sang bass in Serge Jaroff's Don Cossack Choir and was cantor in a Russian Orthodox church. Gedda grew up bilingual in Swedish and Russian, and from 1929 to 1934 when his family were living in Leipzig, Germany, he learned German. At the age of 5 Gedda took part in a vocal quartet in the orthodox church in the city. They returned to Sweden in 1934, and the boy attended Katarina Secondary School and the Södra Grammar School. In school he learned English, French and Latin, learning Italian on his own after leaving school.

Gedda worked first as a bank teller in a bank in Stockholm and was obliged to support his parents financially; his sleeping arrangements were an alcove off the kitchen in their Stockholm apartment. One day he told a customer – a member of the Royal Opera House Orchestra – that he was searching for a good singing teacher, and the client recommended Carl Martin Öhman, a well known Wagnerian tenor from the 1920s, who is also credited with discovering Jussi Björling. Öhman was enthusiastic about Gedda and took him as a pupil, at the beginning without payment, because Gedda was at the time supporting his parents. Two months later his progress was such that he obtained a grant and then won the Christine Nilsson Prize. After a few months he obtained a scholarship and was later able to pay for Öhman's singing lessons. At the Royal Academy of Music and Opera School in Stockholm Gedda was in the class of Kurt Bendix and Ragnar Hyltén-Cavallius from 1950 to 1952.

== Opera career ==
Gedda made his debut at the Royal Swedish Opera in Stockholm as part of the vocal quartet in the premiere of Der rote Stiefel by Sutermeister in November 1951. In April 1952, at the age of 26, Gedda made his triumphant debut in a principal role in Stockholm, performing Chapelou in Adolphe Adam's Le postillon de Lonjumeau, alongside Hjördis Schymberg. The 'Ronde du Postillon' in the opera, ("Mes amis, écoutez l'histoire"), is considered one of the most difficult tenor arias in all of opera, as it calls for a demanding high D from the soloist.

An early appraisal of Gedda's singing was offered by Walter Legge, after first hearing him sing for the role of Dmitry in a planned recording of Musorgsky's Boris Godunov.

On my arrival at the airport I was asked by a swarm of journalists if I were not interested in hearing their excellent young Swedish voices. Naturally I was interested, but I did not expect either the front page stories that appeared next morning or the mass of letters and almost incessant telephone calls asking to be heard. I had to ask the Director of the Opera for a room for a couple of days to hear about 100 young aspirants. The first to sing to me (at 9.30 in the morning) was Gedda who had, I believe, sung only once in public. He sang the Carmen Flower Song so tenderly yet passionately that I was moved almost to tears. He delivered the difficult rising scale ending with a clear and brilliant B flat. Almost apologetically I asked him to try to sing it as written – pianissimo, rallentando and diminuendo. Without turning a hair he achieved the near-miracle, incredibly beautifully and without effort. I asked him to come back at 8 that evening and sent word to my wife that a great singer had fallen into my lap and to Dobrowen that, believe it or not, this 23-year-old Gedda was the heaven-sent Dmitry for our Boris.

As a result of the audition with Legge, Gedda was contracted for three His Master's Voice recordings – Boris Godunov, Lehár's Die Lustige Witwe and Das Land des Lächelns – as well as Bach's Mass in B minor and a Swedish song recital accompanied by Bendix. In 1953, he made his début at La Scala in Milan as Don Ottavio in Mozart's Don Giovanni, followed by one of the tenor soloists in the premiere of Orff's Trionfo di Afrodite. In January the following year he made his debut at the Paris Opera as Damon in Rameau's Les Indes galantes, then Hüon in Weber's Oberon and Tamino in Mozart's The Magic Flute, Alfredo in Verdi's La traviata and the Duke of Mantua in Verdi's Rigoletto in 1956, Cassio in Verdi's Otello in 1957 and the title role in Gounod's Faust in 1961. He was based in France at this time, and began an association with the Aix-en-Provence Festival in 1954, starting with Belmonte in Mozart's Die Entführung aus dem Serail and Vincent in Gounod's Mireille, then Orphée in Gluck's Orphée et Eurydice, Thespis and Mercure in Rameau's Platée, and Ferrando in Mozart's Così fan tutte; several productions being recorded. Diapason magazine described him as the greatest French tenor of his generation, both for his essential casting in Faust and Offenbach's The Tales of Hoffmann, but also for his role in the re-emergence of interest in French grand opera, which owed much to his ability to match the requirements of roles such as Arnold in Rossini's Guillaume Tell, the Cellini and Enée of Berlioz, as well as the title role of Meyerbeer's Le prophète. In 1966, prior to assuming the role at Covent Garden, Gedda said that Cellini was one of his favourite parts; when he prepared the role for the Holland Festival production in 1961 he became totally absorbed in the historical figure of the 16th-century Italian goldsmith and sculptor.

External audio
- Gedda as Camille, Count de Rosillon in Franz Lehár's opera The Merry Widow, Lovro von Matačić conducting the Philharmonia Orchestra with Elisabeth Schwarzkopf, Eberhard Waechter in 1963

In Salzburg, he took part in the August 1957 premiere of the three-act version of Rolf Liebermann's Die Schule der Frauen (as Oronte), conducted by George Szell, where Gedda "matched his free lyric tenor with an animation of personality that came as a surprise". After his U.S debut as Faust in Pittsburgh in 1957, Gedda made his Metropolitan Opera debut in the title role of Faust the same year, and went on to sing 28 roles there over the next 26 years, including Anatol in the world premiere of Barber's Vanessa and the U.S. premiere of Menotti's The Last Savage. He was the last singer to stand on the stage of the 'old Met': the final curtain of the gala evening fell after his appearance in the finale from Faust.

Gedda made his Royal Opera House début in 1954 as the Duke in Rigoletto (in English). He returned in 1963 for La damnation de Faust and for Benvenuto Cellini (in 1966, 1969 and 1976); Alfredo in 1972, Gustavo III in Verdi's Un ballo in maschera in 1977, Nemorino in Donizetti's L'elisir d'amore in 1981, Lensky in Tchaikovsky's Eugene Onegin (in 1979 and 1982) and Abdisu in Pfitzner's Palestrina.

Gedda's only foray in Wagner was the title role in Lohengrin in Stockholm in January 1966, where one critic wrote that his "command of intonation and rhythm contributed to an overwhelmingly beautiful impression right from his unaccompanied appearance in the first act". He was supposed to sing Lohengrin at the Bayreuth Festival in 1967, but his engagement for an American television film of Faust in the summer of that year prevented it.

Gedda made more than 200 complete LP and CD recordings over a wide variety of styles and several of the roles may be considered among the most challenging in the entire operatic repertoire, notably Arnold in Guillaume Tell and Arturo in Bellini's I puritani, both requiring high notes and an easy legato line. In recordings he was also noted in lighter opera, whether the Viennese operettas of Strauss (Die Fledermaus, Eine Nacht in Venedig, Wienerblut) or Lehár (Die lustige Witwe, Das Land des Lächelns), in Bernstein (Candide) and Hahn (Ciboulette).

He had a small role in the 1952 film Eldfågeln, in which he sang "Ack, Värmeland du sköna".

A singer of unusual longevity, Gedda was active well into his late 70s; in May 2001 he recorded the role of the Emperor Altoum in Puccini's Turandot and the role of the High Priest in Mozart's Idomeneo in June 2003.

== Concert ==
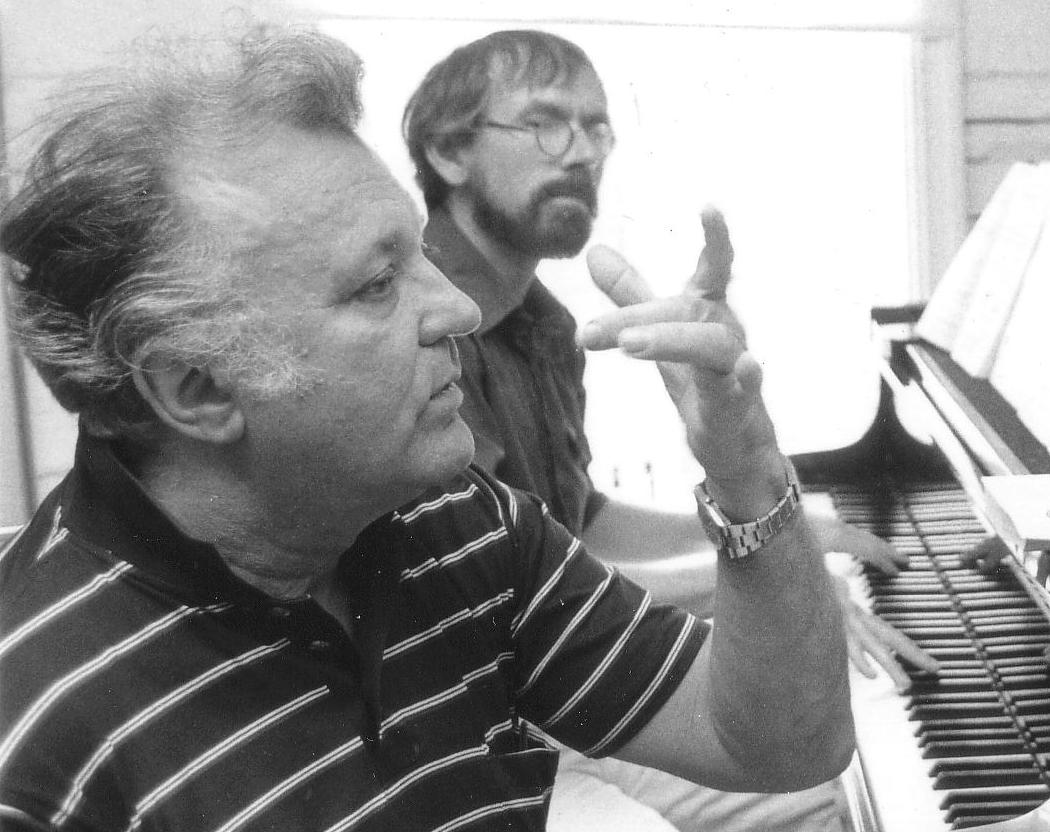
Nicolai Gedda at the Korsholm Music Festival, 1987.

In addition to his opera performances, Gedda cultivated an active parallel career on the concert platform and as a recitalist, with a large repertoire of French, German, Scandinavian, and Russian art songs as well as larger works for the concert platform. As an interpreter of Lieder he performed for over 25 years with the pianist Jan Eyron. Gedda's language skills, intellectual approach and musicality, as well as his extensive recordings, rendered him particularly indispensable in this genre. He also sang, and recorded, sacred music, including Russian liturgical music. His discography includes large-scale sacred works such as Mozart's Requiem, Beethoven's Christ on the Mount of Olives, Missa solemnis and Ninth Symphony, Lélio, ou le retour à la vie, Mendelssohn's Elijah, Verdi's Requiem and Elgar's The Dream of Gerontius; while his song repertoire extended beyond Swedish composers and folksongs to Schubert, Schumann, a wide range of Russian romances from Glinka to Rachmaninoff, mélodies, Janáček's The Diary of One Who Disappeared, and many Russian folksongs.

== Honours ==
In 1965 he became a Swedish Court Singer and in 1966 he was inducted into the Royal Swedish Academy of Music. In 1968 he was a recipient of the Swedish royal medal Litteris et Artibus. In 1976 he was awarded the Gold Medal for the Promotion of the Art of Music (Swedish: För tonkonstens främjande) by the Royal Swedish Academy of Music, and in 2007 he received the Caruso prize.

In 2010 he received the Legion of Honor (Légion d'honneur), the highest French decoration, from then president of France Nicolas Sarkozy.

Gedda was a visiting professor at the Royal Academy of Music in London, and in 1994 he was made an Honorary Member of the Royal Academy.

== Personal life and death ==
Outside music Gedda had many hobbies, as a keen sportsman and a connoisseur of painting and sculpture. He was well-read in literature, often reading works of major novelists in the original where he commanded the language. He also had a passion for visiting zoos, saying that if he did not have to travel for his profession he would like "to keep a complete menagerie in my home".

Gedda's first marriage was to the pianist Nadine Sapounoff-Nova (1953–1961), his second to Anastasia Caraviotis, an American of Greek origin (1965–1991), and last from 1997 to the journalist and writer Aino Sellermark.

Gedda published his first memoir, Gåvan är inte gratis (The gift is not free) in 1977, with the help of his future wife, Aino Sellermark. This was translated as Nicolai Gedda: My Life and Art, which Amadeus Press published in 1999.

Gedda died on 8 January 2017, aged 91, following a heart attack at his home in Tolochenaz in the canton of Vaud, Switzerland. His death was not announced by his family until 9 February 2017. He was buried in an unmarked memorial plot (minneslund) in Galärvarvskyrkogården, Stockholm.

== Partial discography ==
The following is a selection of Gedda studio recordings, either mentioned in the main text, appearing in Opera on Record volumes 1 & 2, or receiving a rosette in the Penguin Record Guide books.

- Bach – Mass in B minor, (tenor solo) Philharmonia Chorus and Philharmonia Orchestra, Otto Klemperer EMI 1967
- Bellini – I puritani (Arturo) Ambrosian Chorus, London Philharmonic Orchestra, Julius Rudel, ABC 1973
- Berlioz – Benvenuto Cellini (Cellini) Royal Opera Chorus, BBC Symphony Orchestra, Colin Davis, Philips 1972
- Bernstein – Candide (Governor, Vanderdendur, Ragotski) conducted by Bernstein. Deutsche Grammophon, 1991
- Bizet – Carmen (Don José) RTF Orchestra & Chorus, Thomas Beecham, His Master's Voice 1959
- Bizet - Les pêcheurs de perles Théâtre de l'Opéra-comique, Paris; EMI 1961
- Bizet – Carmen (Don José) René Duclos Choir, Paris Opéra Orchestra, Georges Prêtre, His Master's Voice 1964
- Elgar – The Dream of Gerontius (Gerontius) John Alldis Choir, New Philharmonia Orchestra, Adrian Boult, EMI 1975
- Enescu – Œdipe (Le berger) Orfeon Donostierra, Monte-Carlo Philharmonic Orchestra, Lawrence Foster, EMI 1989
- Gluck – Orphée et Eurydice (Orphée) Paris Conservatoire Orchestra, Louis de Froment, Pathé 1956
- Gounod – Faust (Faust) Paris Opéra Chorus & Orchestra, André Cluytens, His Master's Voice 1954 and 1958
- Lehár – The Merry Widow (Camille) Philharmoia Chorus & Orchestra, Lovro von Matačić, EMI 1962
- Massenet – Werther (Werther) ORTF Orch & Chorus, Georges Prêtre, His Master's Voice 1968
- Mozart – Die Entführung aus dem Serail (Belmonte) Vienna State Opera Chorus and Orchestra, Josef Krips, EMI 1966
- Mozart – Die Zauberflöte (Tamino) Philharmonia Chorus & Orchestra, Otto Klemperer, His Master's Voice 1964
- Mussorgsky – Boris Godunov (Grigory/Dmitry) Russian Chorus of Paris, French National Radio Orchestra, Issay Dobrowen, His Master's Voice 1952
- Offenbach – Les Contes d'Hoffmann (Hoffmann) René Duclos Choir, Paris Conservatoire Orchestra, André Cluytens, EMI 1964
- Prokofiev – War and Peace (Anatol Kuragin) French National Radio Chorus & Orchestra, Mstislav Rostropovich, Erato 1986
- Puccini – La bohème (Rodolfo) Rome Opera Chorus and Orch, Thomas Schippers, EMI 1963
- Puccini – Madama Butterfly (Pinkerton) La Scala Chorus and Orchestra, Herbert von Karajan, EMI 1955
- Rossini – Guillaume Tell (Arnold) Ambrosian Chorus, Royal Philharmonic Orchestra, Lamberto Gardelli, EMI 1972
- Rossini – Stabat Mater (tenor soloist), Westminster Choir, NBC Symphony Orchestra, Arturo Toscanini, RCA Victor 1952
- Shostakovich – Lady MacBeth of Mtsensk (Sergey) Ambrosian Opera Chorus, London Philharmonic Orchestra, Rostropovich, EMI 1979
- Strauss – Die Fledermaus (Eisenstein) Philharmonia, Herbert von Karajan, EMI 1955
- Verdi – Rigoletto (Duke) Rome Opera Chorus and Orch, Francesco Molinari-Pradelli, EMI 1967
- Russian Liturgical Chants – (tenor solo) Choir of the Russian Orthodox Cathedral, Paris, Eugen Evetz, Philips 1972

== Notes ==
Sources

- Gedda, Nicolai; Sellermark Gedda, Aino (1999). Nicolai Gedda: My Life & Art. Opera Biography Series (vol. 12). Translated by Tom Geddes. Portland, Oregon: Amadeus Press. ISBN 978-1-5746-7048-6.
