= Michael Minsky =

Michael (Gregory) Minsky (Russian: Михаил (Григорий) Минский; born Michael Spirin (Spiridonov), also known as Mino Minzer and between Ukrainians as Myhailo Minsky; 12 August 1918, Bagaevo, Kazan Governorate, Russian SFSR – 9 October 1988, Zwolle, Netherlands) was a baritone singer, one of the finest interpreters of Russian and Ukrainian songs, and a conductor of the Don Cossack Choir Serge Jaroff.

== Russian years ==
Since early childhood, Minsky showed an interest in music and culture. He mastered the bayan (accordion) and showed his talents as a singer while quite young. In 1935, Minsky was admitted to the Rabfak College (workers faculty) at Kazan State University where he studied geology. In 1941, he joined the college choir and was later selected by Maria Wladimirowna Wladimirowa to study at the Moscow Conservatory, who predicted a glittering opera career for him. But her plans for Minsky were thwarted by the Soviet Union's entry into World War II on 22 June 1941.

== World War II ==
Minsky was drafted into the Red Army on 2 August 1942 and trained for four months in Saratov. He was soon taken prisoner, spending a total of 33 months in various POW camps near the front lines. In 1943, he was put to work as a forced labourer near the Hungarian border. His overseer turned out to be the brother-in-law of a tenor from the Platoff Don Cossack Choir, who told Minsky about the Don Cossack Choir Serge Jaroff.

== Refugee camps ==
After the war, from 1945 to 1948, Minsky moved between a number of refugee camps. Cultural life blossomed spectacularly in these camps, and 3 November 1945, Minsky joined the newly formed Trembita choir in Bad Hersfeld, led by Professor Tsependa.

This choir performed in many other camps, including Ingolstadt in 1946 and Bad Kissingen. Minsky later moved to the culturally rich Karlsfeld camp. After its closure, the refugees were relocated to the camps of Berchtesgaden and Mittenwald. On 15 November 1946, Minsky joined the Ukrainian Bandurist Chorus in Bad Kissingen. That same year the choir was invited to make a tour to the USA.

== United States – Ukrainian years ==
Minsky left for New York on 5 May 1949. Later that year, he and the Bandurist Choir were received at the White House and gave a range of concerts in venues including the Mansonic Auditorium on 2 October 1949.

He made his first records in 1950 and till about 1962 he made another twenty records with famous Ukrainian artists. During his career Minsky sang in virtually every major concert hall in the United States, playing in Carnegie Hall for the first time in 1953.

He was granted US citizenship of 21 February 1953 and changed his name from Spirin to Minsky. In 1954 he made his debut in Philadelphia in Aida.

All this period Minsky was very active in the Ukrainian community. He performed numerous times at all major cities with large Ukrainian population in America and Canada. He worked and collaborated with Ukrainian diasporan composers such as Mykola Fomenko, Andrij Hnatyshyn, W. Hrudyn, Prof. J. B. Rudnyskyj and Ihor Sonevytsky. He issued several long-playing records with Ukrainian folk songs, songs of the Ukrainian Legion of World War I and the Ukrainian Underground Army. In 1971 the Ukrainian community in Minneapolis celebrated Minsky's 50th anniversary with a gala concert. The same year Minsky went on concert tour to the Ukrainian centers in Great Britain and in 1972 the United Ukrainian Organizations of Australia sponsored his critically acclaimed concert tour on that continent. From 1946 till 1984 Minsky participated as soloist in almost all concerts and concert tours of the Ukrainian Bandurist Chorus.

== Bandurists ==
In 1958, five singers went on tour. In the autumn of that year, Minsky and the Bandurist Chorus began a tour through the United Kingdom, Switzerland, Denmark, Sweden and the Netherlands, where he performed at the Concertgebouw in Amsterdam on 18 November. The next year, while studying in Rome he was granted an audition by the Pope.

The period from early 1946 to 1984 would see him regularly return to the choir as a soloist and was singing with Ivan Zadorozny, Volodymyr Bozyk and Hryhory Kytasty.

== Cossack choirs ==
Minsky joined the Black Sea Cossack Choir in the early 1960s, alongside his participation in Rodina (1962, 1963 and 1964); when Rodina closed the doors, he sang from 1966 until 1968 in Datscha, also in Hamburg. Around this time, he received a contract to sing in New Orleans with Pagliacci. In early 1963 he performed in La Scala in Philadelphia. He gave also concerts in Friends Academy in New York with Ludmilla Azova.

From 1 September 1963 to 31 August 1964, Minsky collaborated with the Gelsenkirchen Opera. Although under contract with the Don Cossack Choir Serge Jaroff and its conductor from 1948 onwards, it was only late in 1964 that he could join the Don Cossack Choir Serge Jaroff in Luzern. He would remain with Jaroff until spring 1979. On 22 April 1966, Minsky performed once again at the Mansonic Auditorium in Detroit. At that time Minsky was already spending most of his time in Europe.

== Australia ==
In 1972, Minsky toured Australia and produced a series of records with the Vienna Symphony Orchestra. In 1978, he settled permanently in Zwolle, a city in the east of the Netherlands.

== Netherlands ==
On 7 January 1980, Minsky set up a mixed amateur choir in Zwolle, within a few months it made its concert and television debuts. This success brought Minsky an invitation to become conductor of the Ural Cossacks amateur choir in The Hague, and eventuated in him conducting from 1984 until 1988, the professional Ural Cossack Choir in Germany. Afterwards, in the autumn 1984, he took up and led an amateur Cossack Choir in Rijswijk. Of these two undertakings, in his autobiography he would later write with a sense of dissatisfaction.

When Otto Hofner (Jaroff's friend and manager) asked him to renew conducting the Original Don Cossack Choir, with Nicolai Gedda as soloist—as Jaroff had wished—Minsky did not hesitate. But, although he did conduct a tour of major Germany halls, when Gedda refused to perform on a daily basis, Minsky became ill and Hofner wound down the project.

=== Final days ===
On 10 May 1988 he was presented with the Meester Willem Bartjens prize by the Mayor of Zwolle, Gouke Loopstra. This award is dedicated to residents of Zwolle who have won their city world renown.

Minsky, sensing his death was near, completely devoted himself to the organization of the Dutch celebration of the thousand-year anniversary of the Christianization of Kievan Rus'. He was one of the initiators of this anniversary celebration, eventually held on 30 September 1988 and attended, among others, by Her Majesty, Queen Beatrix of the Netherlands. Minsky died nine days later on 9 October 1988, and was buried in Zwolle on 14 October.

== Sources ==
- Koren, Kerken en Kozakken, ISBN 90-5383-570-9.
- Samchuk, Ulas Z︠H︡yvi struny: bandura i bandurysty. Detroit: Vyd. Kapeli Bandurystiv im. Tarasa Shevchenka, 1976
- DVD film Don Cossack Choir Serge Jaroff Brilliantclassics nr.8892
- Lysenko, Ivan. Dictionary of Ukrainian Singers, Kiev, 1997
- Encyclopedia of Ukraine. University of Toronto
- Documentary Russian TV
- The Minsky archive at the Overijssel Historical Centre in Zwolle, the Netherlands
