= Manfred Trojahn =

German musician and academic (born 1949)

- Born: 22 October 1949 (age 76); Cremlingen, Lower Saxony, Germany
- Education: Hochschule für Musik und Theater Hamburg
- Occupations: Composer; Academic teacher
- Organizations: Robert Schumann Hochschule; Deutscher Komponistenverband; Academy of Arts, Berlin

Manfred Trojahn (born 22 October 1949) is a German composer, flutist, conductor, writer and academic teacher.

== Career ==
Trojahn was born Cremlingen in Lower Saxony and began his musical studies in 1966 in orchestra music at the music school of Braunschweig. After graduating in 1970 he concluded his studies as a flutist at the Hochschule für Musik und Theater Hamburg with Karlheinz Zöller. From 1971 he studied composition with Diether de la Motte. He also studied with György Ligeti, conducting with Albert Bittner. Since 1991 he is professor for musical composition at the Robert Schumann Hochschule in Düsseldorf. From 2004 until 2006 he was President of the Deutscher Komponistenverband; from 2008 to 2012 he was vice-director of the music section of the Academy of Arts, Berlin.

== Works ==
His works have been published by Bärenreiter and Sikorski.

== Publications ==
- Trojahn, Manfred (2006). Wagner, Hans-Joachim (ed.). Schriften zur Musik (in German). Frankfurt und Basel: Stroemfeld Verlag. ISBN 3-87877-945-3.

== Students ==
Among Trojahn's students in composition are Oscar van Dillen, Matthias Pintscher and Daniel Hensel.
