= List of Imperial Russian Army Don Cossack regiments =

The Imperial Army of the Russian Empire fielded numerous cavalry regiments from the Don Cossack Host. until the abdication of Emperor Nicholas II in 1917, at which point many fought in the Russian Civil War and were finally disbanded after the fall of the White movement to the Bolsheviks.

== World War I ==
- 1st Don Cossack Regiment|1st Don Cossack Generalissimo Duke Suvorov Regiment
- 2nd Don Cossack His Imperial Majesty the Tsarevich's Regiment
- 3rd Don Cossack Yermak Timofeyevich Regiment
- 4th Don Cossack Count Platov Regiment
- 5th Don Cossack Host Ataman Vlasov Regiment
- 6th Don Cossack General Krasnoshchyokov Regiment
- 7th Don Cossack Host Ataman Denisov Regiment
- 8th Don Cossack General Ilovaysky XII Regiment
- 9th Don Cossack Adjutant-General Count Orlov-Denisov Regiment
- 10th Don Cossack General Lukovin Regiment
- 11th Don Cossack General of Cavalry Count Denisov Regiment
- 12th Don Cossack General Field Marshal Duke Potemkin-Tvarichesky Regiment
- 13th Don Cossack General Field Marshal Duke Kutuzov Smolensky Regiment
- 14th Don Cossack Host Ataman Yefremov Regiment
- 15th Don Cossack General Krasnov I Regiment
- 16th Don Cossack General Grekov VIII Regiment
- 17th Don Cossack General Baklanov Regiment
- 18th Don Cossack Regiment
- 19th Don Cossack Regiment
- 20th Don Cossack Regiment
- 21st Don Cossack Regiment
- 22nd Don Cossack Regiment
- 23rd Don Cossack Regiment
- 24th Don Cossack Regiment
- 25th Don Cossack Regiment
- 26th Don Cossack Regiment
- 27th Don Cossack Regiment
- 28th Don Cossack Regiment
- 29th Don Cossack Regiment
- 30th Don Cossack Regiment
- 31st Don Cossack Regiment
- 32nd Don Cossack Regiment
- 33rd Don Cossack Regiment
- 34th Don Cossack Regiment
- 35th Don Cossack Regiment
- 36th Don Cossack Regiment
- 37th Don Cossack Regiment
- 38th Don Cossack Regiment
- 39th Don Cossack Regiment
- 40th Don Cossack Regiment
- 41st Don Cossack Regiment
- 42nd Don Cossack Regiment
- 43rd Don Cossack Regiment
- 44th Don Cossack Regiment
- 45th Don Cossack Regiment
- 46th Don Cossack Regiment
- 47th Don Cossack Regiment
- 48th Don Cossack Regiment
- 49th Don Cossack Regiment
- 50th Don Cossack Regiment
- 51st Don Cossack Regiment
- 52nd Don Cossack Regiment
- 53rd Don Cossack Regiment
- 54th Don Cossack Regiment
- 55th Don Cossack Regiment
- 56th Don Cossack Regiment
- 57th Don Cossack Regiment
- 58th Don Cossack Regiment
- 1st Combined Don Cossack Regiment
- 2nd Combined Don Cossack Regiment
- 3rd Combined Don Cossack Regiment
- 4th Combined Don Cossack Regiment
