= Mes amis, écoutez l'histoire =

"Mes amis, écoutez l'histoire", is a tenor aria in Adolphe Adam's 1836 opera Le postillon de Lonjumeau. The D_{5} in the final verse is the highest commonly sung note for tenors in opera. Donizetti wrote an E♭_{5} for Edgardo in the first act of his opera Lucia di Lammermoor, though it is very rarely sung. Higher notes are occasionally sung in interpolations and ornaments in other bel canto operas, and exceptionally the written F_{5} at the end of "Credeasi, misera" in Bellini's I puritani.

Famous performers of this aria are Nicolai Gedda, Helge Rosvaenge and Joseph Schmidt, often performing the German version, "Freunde, vernehmet die Geschichte".

== Lyrics ==
Mes amis, écoutez l'histoire
D'un jeune et galant postillon.
C'est véridique, on peut m'en croire
Et connu de tout le canton.
Quand il passait dans un village,
Tout le beau sexe était ravi
Et le cœur de la plus sauvage
Galopait en croupe avec lui.

Oh Oh Oh Oh
Qu'il était beau le postillon de Lonjumeau

Maintes dames de haut parage
En l'absence de son mari
Parfois se mettaient en voyage
Pour être conduites par lui.
Au procédé toujours fidèle
On savait qu'adroit postillon
S'il versait parfois une belle
Ce n'était que sur le gazon.

Oh Oh Oh Oh
Qu'il était beau le postillon de Lonjumeau

Mais pour conduire un équipage,
Voilà qu'un soir il est parti
Depuis ce temps dans le village
On n'entend plus parler de lui
Mais ne déplorez pas sa perte
Car de l'hymen suivant la loi
La reine d'une île déserte
De ses sujets l'a nommé roi.

Oh Oh Oh Oh
Qu'il était beau le postillon de Lonjumeau

Come, friends, and listen to the story
Of a postilion gay and young,
Well known to all, his fame and glory
Through ev'ry land have they been sung.
When he did pass thro' town or village
Each maiden's eye was fill'd with joy,
And among hearts he made sad pillage
He was a gay and roving boy.

Oh! Oh! Oh! Oh! so great a beau
Was the postilion of Lonjumeau.

Fine ladies from the best circles,
In the absence of their husbands,
Sometimes used his coach
To be led by him.
Alway faithful to the journey
The postilion's skills were well known –
If he turned to a beauty
It was only on the lawn.

Oh! Oh! Oh! Oh! so great a beau
Was the postilion of Lonjumeau.

But to lead a coach voyage
He had left one evening;
Since that time in the village
Nothing more was heard of him.
But we shall not deplore his parting
Because he lawfully married
A desert island's queen
And became king of its people.

Oh! Oh! Oh! Oh! so great a beau
Was the postilion of Lonjumeau.
