= Pavel Kripakov =

- Born: Pavel Nikolaevich Kripakov; February 10, 1908; Tatishchevskaya, station of the Orenburg Cossack Host, Russian Empire
- Died: October 7, 1985 (aged 77); Connecticut, U.S.
- Occupation: Singer
- Spouse: Lydia Nikolaevna Kripakova (m. 1941)
- Children: Nikolai Kripakov
- Musical career
- Genres: folk and gypsy music
- Instrument: Vocals

Pavel Nikolaevich Kripakov (Russian: Павел Николаевич Крипаков; February 10, 1908 - October 7, 1985) was a Russian-born American singer who was a member of the Don Cossack Choir.

== Biography ==
Born in Tatishchevskaya, station of the Orenburg Cossack Host, during a period of revolutionary upheaval, Kripakov's early life was marked by his father's efforts to protect the family from the threat faced by tsarist officers. Placed in the Don Cadet Corps in Novocherkassk, Kripakov discovered his talent for singing under the guidance of choir director N.M. Verushkin.

The choir's reputation reached international acclaim, leading to a trip to Jerusalem organized by Father Dimitry Troitsky. However, the Corps faced relocation, eventually disbanding in Varna, marking the end of its existence. Kripakov's father found him and secured a place for him in the Don Cadet Corps named after Alexander III in Gorazde, Bosnia and Herzegovina.

Graduating in 1929, Kripakov pursued higher education in Belgrade, Serbia. While studying, he also received singing lessons and joined the Platovsky Cossack Choir, embarking on a global tour that lasted two years. During his travels, Kripakov's father died. Returning to Belgrade, he worked in a restaurant, later joining the Zharovsky Choir before being drafted into the Yugoslav military.

After completing his service, Kripakov received an invitation to join the Zharovsky Choir on a tour in America. In 1941, he married Lydia Nikolaevna, who had moved to the United States from Russia in her youth. The couple settled in Connecticut, where Kripakov took up employment at the Sikorsky Aircraft Plant in 1950.

Parallel to his work at Sikorsky, Kripakov performed in Russian restaurants, performing folk and gypsy music. In 1956, he released his first solo record, "Russian Gypsy Songs," followed by "Russian Songs" in 1959.

=== Later life and death ===
In 1971, Kripakov's wife, Lydia, secured a position in the Slavic department of the Yale Library, leading to Kripakov's retirement. His later years were marked by health issues, including angina pectoris and Alzheimer's disease. He died on October 7, 1985. Lydia Nikolaevna cared for him until his death. Lydia died on January 21, 2010. Their son Nikolai resides in Colorado.

== Discography ==
- Russian Songs (1959)
- Russian Gypsy Songs (1956)
