= Azov Sea Region Museum of Cossacks =

Museum in Azov, Rostov, Russia

Museum of Cossacks, Ethnography and Culture (Russian: Музей казачества, этнографии и культуры Приазовья) is a museum in Kagalnik, in the town of Azov. centered on the lives of Don Cossacks and ethnic Ukrainians, fishing and coastal research in the Azov region.

== Museum ==
The Museum of Cossacks, Ethnography, and Culture was opened on January 26, 2012. The museum is situated in the Kagalnik, a village in the Azov district of Rostov Oblast. Gennady Matishov, chairman of the Southern Scientific Center RAS contributed to the creation of the museum.

The scientific staff of the museum is engaged in studying the traditional culture of fishermen in the Don river delta and collecting regional ethnographic artifacts and documents. The museum's exhibits include mock-ups of residential buildings of the Don Delta population, models of stone and wooden churches on the Donskoy plantation, models of boats used for fishing in the Don delta (e.g.: kayak, kayuk, baida, oak, boat, etc.) as well as related items such as fishing nets and oars.

The museum exposition presents two main settlement complexes: the Donskoy plantation, populated mainly by Don Cossacks, and the Kagalnik village, which was founded by peasants from Ukraine. The exhibition is based on genuine artifacts, documents, photos, and household items. The museum features antique furniture, a sewing machine, samovars, etc. Objects such as fishing nets, anchors, irons, dishes and other facets of daily Cossack life are on display. A stand in the museum is dedicated to the traditional noon gathering of Don Cossack women to drink coffee and socialize.
