= Serge Jaroff =

Russian composer

Serge Alexis Jaroff
- Серге́й Алексе́евич Жа́ров
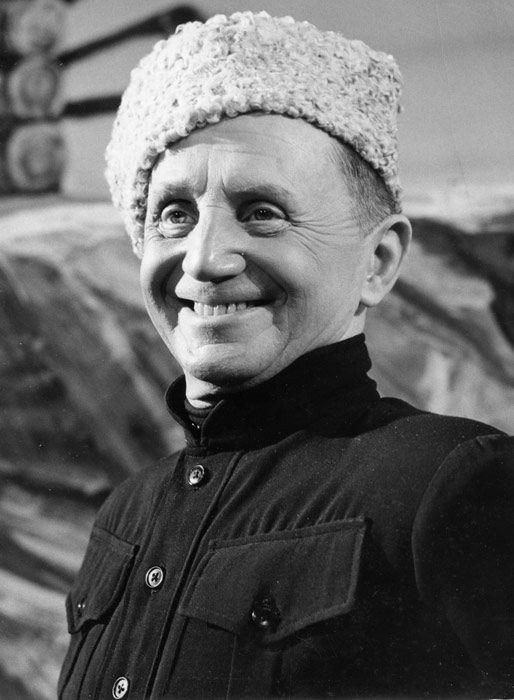
- Born: 1 April 1896; Makaryev, Kostroma Governorate, Russian Empire
- Died: 5 October 1985 (aged 89); Lakewood Township, New Jersey, U.S.
- Resting place: St Mary's R.O. Cemetery, Jackson, New Jersey
- Children: 1

Serge Alexis Jaroff (Russian: Серге́й Алексе́евич Жа́ров) (1 April [O.S. 20 March] 1896 – 5 October 1985) was the founder, conductor and composer of the Don Cossack Choir Serge Jaroff.

== Biography ==
Jaroff was born 1 April [O.S. 20 March] 1896 in Makaryev, Kostroma Governorate, Russian Empire. He trained at the Moscow Synod School for Choral Singing. He served as a Don Cossack lieutenant in the Russian Civil War. In 1920, the Don Army were driven into the Crimea by the Red Army. From there they evacuated to a Turkish internment camp near Constantinople, (now Istanbul). In January 1921, Jaroff put together a choir from Russian refugees in the internment camp. Most of the singers who later performed in the Don Cossacks Choir had been members of the Don divisions since the war in 1914. The 3rd Don division in March 1921 was interned on the Greek island of Lemnos.

Then the troops, including the singers, were shipped to Burgas, Bulgaria. The Russian representative asked Jaroff and his choir to join the church. On 23 June 1923, they performed in the cathedral of Sofia and made their formal concert debut in Vienna on 4 July 1923. They subsequently toured America where they were extremely popular and had other international tours in the 1930s, 40s and 50s. The men, dressed as Cossacks, sang a repertory of a cappella Russian sacred and operatic music, army songs and folk songs. Cossack dancing was eventually added to the performance.

Jaroff's last tour was in the 1978–1979 season of the company, but Jaroff continued as the choir leader until 1981.

== Personal life ==
Jaroff married Neonila, and had one son, Aljosha. They lived in Lakewood Township, New Jersey, where Jaroff died in 1985. He became a US citizen after World War II. He is buried at St Mary's R.O. Cemetery in Jackson, New Jersey.

== Selected filmography ==
- The White Devil (1930)
- Moscow-Shanghai (1936)
- A Prussian Love Story (1938)
- Yes, Yes, Love in Tyrol (1955)
