= Don Cossack Choir =

The Don Cossack Choir Serge Jaroff (Хор донских казаков Сергея Жарова) is a men's chorus founded in 1921 consisting of exiled Cossacks by Serge Jaroff and conducted for almost sixty years by him.

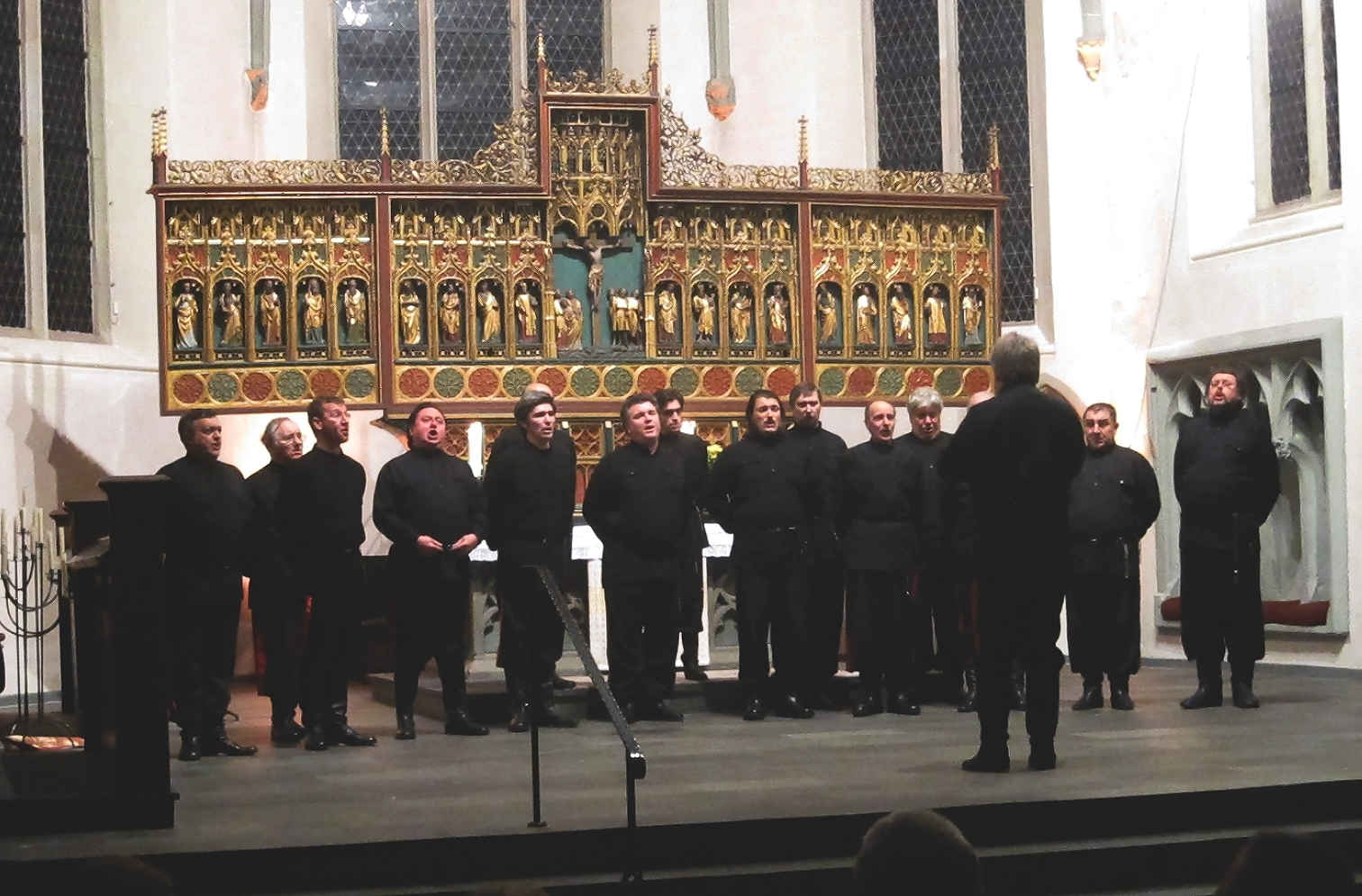
The Don Cossack Choir

== History ==
=== Origins at Çilingir internment camp ===
After suffering total defeat at the hands of the Red Army, many Cossacks ended up in the diaspora. In 1921 it was with these very Russian refugees that Serge Jaroff set about forming a choir in the Turkish internment camp Çilingir, near Istanbul. The Cossacks began to accompany their own church services, and later left for the Greek island of Lemnos. To improve the situation, they started giving open-air concerts, which were especially popular with the British. The Cossack lieutenant, Serge Jaroff, worked hard on his choir's repertoire, until a splendid opportunity presented itself. Troops were to be shipped from Çilingir to the Bulgarian town of Burgas and on their behalf the Russian envoy suggested that Jaroff and his choir should be attached to the church. Although the parish was too poor to support a choir, the offer was accepted and the members of the choir were obliged to find work on the side.

=== Bulgaria to Vienna ===
The arrival of the Don Cossack Choir in Amsterdam 1929

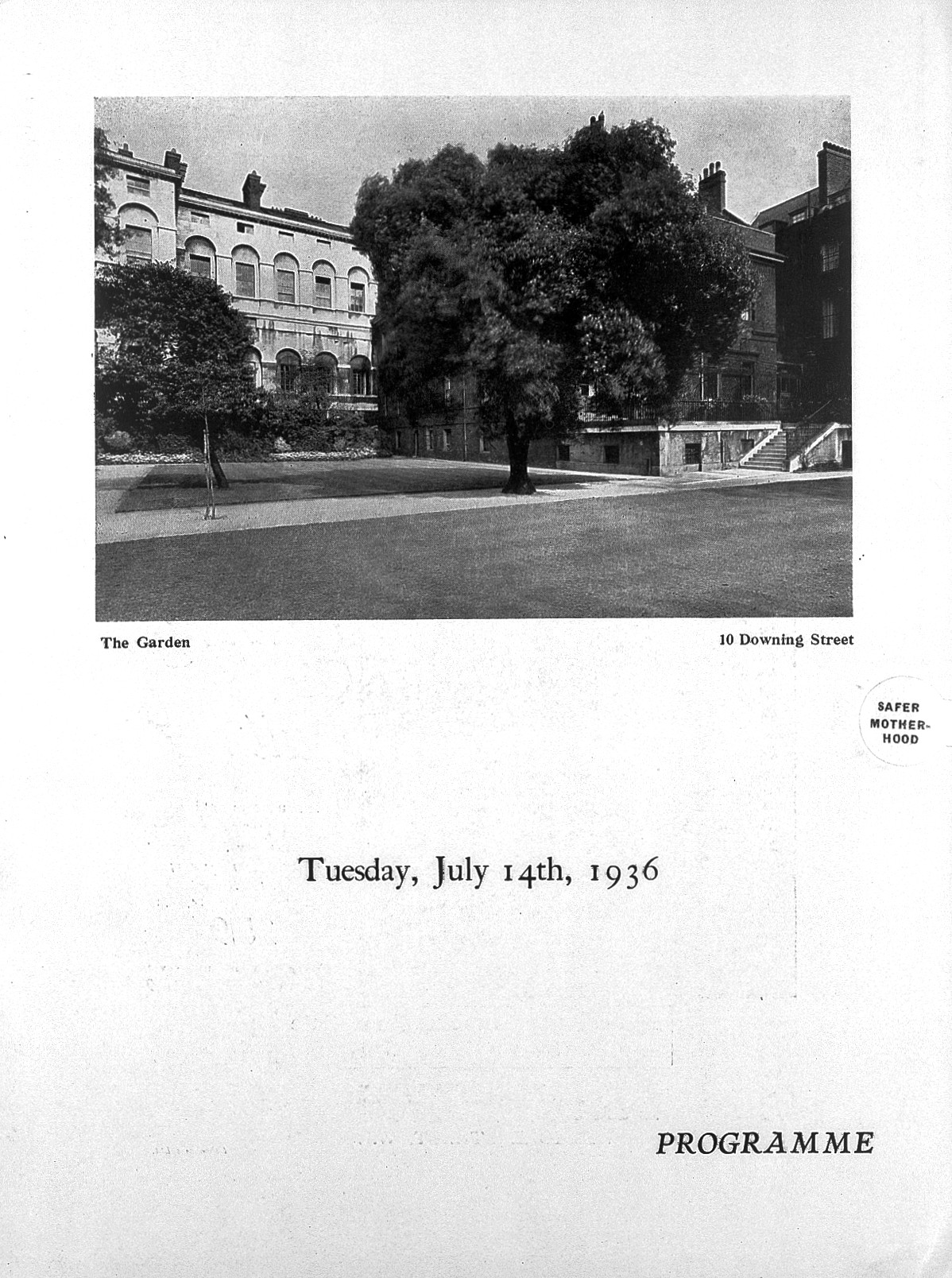
The programme for a concert in Downing Street, London, July 14, 1936

The tents were then exchanged for barracks in Sofia, provided by the Ministry of Defence. The profit from the-often improvised-concerts was about $ 2,- (approx. 8 German marks at the time). Even so, the debut on 23 June 1923 in the Alexander Nevsky Cathedral, Sofia, was excellent for morale.

This was followed by an offer from a factory in the French town of Montargis. The wife of the factory owner was Russian, and since the factory already had a wind band, they also considered having a choir. Unfortunately, lack of funds marooned the choir in Vienna.

Help came from a representative of the League of Nations, who took an interest in the choir. He brought the singers in contact with the director of a concert agency. At an audition in the director's office the singers exceeded all expectations-and a historic decision was made.

But the offer of a concert in the Vienna Hofburg on 4 July 1923 put everything else in the shadows. After this amazingly successful concert in the Austrian capital, the director predicted that the choir would not sing once, but a thousand times. In fact, it would eventually perform in excess of 10,000 concerts.

The choir toured Australia in 1926, leaving behind its lead tenor, Savva Kamaralli (Савва Камаралли), who decided to make his home there.

=== U.S. Citizenship ===
They traveled to the United States for the first time in 1930 and attained U.S. citizenship in a mass ceremony in 1936. With World War II looming, the choir found a new home in the United States and Sol Hurok became manager of the choir.

=== Otto Hofner ===
After the War, in 1953, Konzertdirektion Kurt Collien from Hamburg took over the choir from Clara Ebner, and in 1960 the choir was taken over by Otto Hofner from Cologne. Hofner and Jaroff would eventually become good friends and 20 March 1981 Jaroff transferred all the rights of his choir to Hofner. Otto Hofner also directed three feature films and six TV-movies. The last tour under Serge Jaroff was in 1979, although he continued as choir leader until 1981. Hofner left when Jaroff finally agreed to a tour under the direction of George Markitisch.

=== Michael Minsky ===
In 1985, Otto Hofner sought contact with Michael Minsky. Conforming to Jaroff's wishes, Hofner wished to organize a tour with Nicolai Gedda as soloist and Michael Minsky as conductor. Michael Minsky had been, since 1948 in contact with Jaroff and his choir and since 1964 soloist in the Don Cossack Choir Serge Jaroff. This would take place in 1986, as a memorial to Serge Jaroff. The tour was a success, but when Minsky became ill and Nicolai Gedda did not want to sing every day, Otto Hofner called it quits.

=== Wanja Hlibka ===
In 1991 Wanja Hlibka (Ваня Хлибка), a soloist since 1967, started the choir again with George Tymchenko, another former soloist of the Don Cossack Choir Serge Jaroff. In 2001 Otto Hofner transferred all the rights in the name Don Cossack Choir Serge Jaroff (Хор донских казаков Сергея Жарова) to Wanja Hlibka. The choir continues to give performances.

== Vocal style ==
The Don Cossack Choir was renowned for the quality of the tenors and baritones and for the depth and resonance of the low basses. Every member of this choir was and is trained in a classical or operatic way. The singers can reach sheer power without using amplification. Also the voices have different timbres for different volumes. in the piano range the singers hum in the mezzo piano to mezzo forte the singers switch from a light singing voice to a more deeper sounding voice but with brilliancy. When singing forte a pure operatic bass baritone and tenor voice is achieved with extreme loudness and brightness in the voice. An outstanding feature are the tenors singing in head voice in a soprano range but another feature of this choir is it sings in a unit. The voices have a very good balance throughout the entire singers.

== Notable members ==
- Serge Jaroff
- Pavel Kripakov

== Selected discography and videography ==
Serge Jaroff

- Don Cossacks Choir, Early LP, Columbia 33 SX 1008 (September 1953)
- Don Cossack Choir Serge Jaroff, DVD. Brilliant Classics 8892 (2007)
- Don Cossack Choir Serge Jaroff, DVD. SLAVA! nr. 2013 (2012)
- Vierzig Don Kosaken erobern die Welt, Don Kosaken Chor Serge Jaroff 1921-2015 ISBN 9789081956895
