= Tenor =

Classical male singing voice

The tenor is a type of male singing voice whose vocal range lies between the countertenor and baritone voice types. It is the highest male chest-voice type. Composers typically write music for the tenor in the range from the second B below middle C, to the G above middle C (i.e. B_{2} to G_{4}) in choral music – and from the second B-flat below middle C, to the C above middle C (B♭_{2} to C_{5}) in operatic music – but the range can extend at either end. Subtypes of the tenor include the leggero tenor, lyric tenor, spinto tenor, dramatic tenor, heldentenor and tenor buffo (also known as the spieltenor).

== History ==
The term tenor derives from the Latin word tenere, which means 'to hold'. Tenor came into use, at first, to denote the role of the critical male voice in the structure of a polyphonic vocal work. All other voices were normally calculated in relation to the tenor, which often proceeded in longer note values and carried a borrowed cantus firmus melody. Until the late 16th-century introduction of the contratenor singers, the tenor was usually the lowest voice, assuming the role of providing a foundation. It was in the 18th century that tenor came to signify the male voice that sang such parts. Thus, for earlier repertoire, a line marked 'tenor' indicated the part's role, and not the required voice type; indeed, even as late as the 18th century, part-books labelled 'tenor' sometimes contained parts for a range of voice types.

== Vocal range ==
Tenor vocal range (C_{3}–C_{5}) notated on the treble staff (left) and on piano keyboard in green with dot marking middle C (C_{4}). The numeral eight below the treble clef indicates that the pitches sound an octave lower than written: see Clef#Octave clefs. This is the standard clef for tenor parts in scores.

The vocal range of the tenor is the highest of the male voice types using the modal register. Countertenors will sing about this voice type using falsetto. Within opera, the lowest note in the standard tenor repertoire is widely defined to be B♭_{2}. However, the role of Rodrigo di Dhu (written for Andrea Nozzari) in Rossini's rarely performed La donna del lago is considered a tenor role but requires an A♭_{2}. Within more frequently performed repertoire, Mime and Herod both call for an A_{2}.

A few tenor roles in the standard repertoire call for a "tenor C" (C_{5}, one octave above middle C). Some, if not all, of the few top Cs in the standard operatic repertoire are either optional (such as in "Che gelida manina" in Puccini's La bohème) or interpolated (added) by tradition (an example is the aria "Di quella pira" from Verdi's Il trovatore). However, the highest demanded note in the standard tenor operatic repertoire is D_{5}, found in "Mes amis, écoutez l'histoire" from Adolphe Adam's Le postillon de Lonjumeau and in "Loin de son amie" from Fromental Halévy's La Juive). In the leggero repertoire, the highest note is F_{5} (Arturo in "Credeasi, misera" from Bellini's I puritani); therefore, very few tenors, notably including Nicolai Gedda, have this role in their repertoire without transposition (given the raising of concert pitch since its composition) or employing passaggio, as did Luciano Pavarotti.

== In choral music ==
In SATB four-part mixed chorus, the tenor is the second lowest vocal range, above the bass and below the alto and soprano. Men's chorus usually denotes an ensemble of TTBB in which the first tenor is the highest voice. Whilst certain choral music does require the first tenors to ascend the full tenor range, the majority of choral music places the tenors in the range from approximately B_{2} up to A_{4}. The requirements of the tenor voice in choral music are also tied to the style of music most often performed by a given choir. Orchestral choruses typically call for tenors with fully resonant voices, but chamber or a cappella choral music (choral music sung with no instrumental accompaniment) can rely on baritones singing in falsetto.

Even so, one nearly ubiquitous facet of choral singing is the shortage of tenor voices. Most men's tessituras lie within the baritone range, and because of this, many men in choirs tend to prefer singing in the bass section (though true basses are even rarer than tenors). Many baritones sing tenor even if they are not able to cover the full range in only their chest voice, and sometimes contraltos sing the tenor part. In men's choruses that consist of four male vocal parts (TTBB; tenor 1, tenor 2, bass 1, bass 2), tenors will often sing both in chest voice and falsetto, extending the vocal range of the choir.

== Subtypes and roles in opera ==
Within the tenor voice-type category are seven generally recognized subcategories: leggero tenor, lyric tenor, spinto tenor, dramatic tenor, heldentenor, Mozart tenor, and tenor buffo or spieltenor. There is considerable overlap between the various categories of role and of voice type; some tenor singers have begun with lyric voices but have transformed with time into spinto or even dramatic tenors.

=== Leggero ===
Also known as the tenore di grazia, the leggero tenor is essentially the male equivalent of a lyric coloratura. This voice is light and agile and capable of executing difficult passages of fioritura. The typical leggero tenor possesses a range spanning from approximately C_{3} to E_{5}, with a few being able to sing up to F_{5} or higher in full voice. In some cases, the chest register of the leggero tenor may extend below C_{3}. Voices of this type are utilized frequently in the operas of Rossini, Donizetti, and Bellini and in music dating from the Baroque period.

Leggero tenor roles in operas:

- Arturo, I puritani (Bellini)
- Count Almaviva, The Barber of Seville (Rossini)
- Count Ory, Le comte Ory (Rossini)
- Ernesto, Don Pasquale (Donizetti)
- Elvino, La sonnambula (Bellini)
- Henry Morosus, Die schweigsame Frau (Strauss)
- Lindoro, L'italiana in Algeri (Rossini)
- Don Ramiro, La Cenerentola (Rossini)
- Tonio, La fille du régiment (Donizetti)

=== Lyric ===
Beniamino Gigli singing Che gelida manina from La bohème

The lyric tenor is a warm graceful voice with a bright, full timbre that is strong but not heavy and can be heard over an orchestra. Lyric tenors have a range from approximately the C one octave below middle C (C_{3}) to the D one octave above middle C (D_{5}). Their lower range may extend a few notes below the C_{3}. There are many vocal shades to the lyric tenor group, and repertoire should be selected according to the weight, colors and abilities of the voice.

Gilbert Duprez (1806–1896) was a historically significant dramatic tenor. He was the first tenor to sing on stage the operatic high C from the chest (ut de poitrine) as opposed to using falsettone. He is also known for originating the role of Edgardo in Lucia di Lammermoor.

Lyric tenor roles in operas:

- Alessandro, Il re pastore (Mozart)
- Alfredo, La traviata (Verdi)
- Bastien, Bastien und Bastienne (Mozart)
- Belmonte, Die Entführung aus dem Serail (Mozart)
- Chevalier, Dialogues of the Carmelites (Poulenc)
- David, Die Meistersinger von Nürnberg (Wagner)
- Don Ottavio, Don Giovanni (Mozart)
- Il Duca di Mantova, Rigoletto (Verdi)
- Edgardo, Lucia di Lammermoor (Donizetti)
- Faust, Faust (Gounod)
- Ferrando, Così fan tutte (Mozart)
- Hoffmann, The Tales of Hoffmann (Offenbach)
- Idomeneo, Idamante, Idomeneo (Mozart)
- Lensky, Eugene Onegin (Tchaikovsky)
- Martin, The Tender Land (Copland)
- Mitridate, Mitridate, re di Ponto (Mozart)
- Oronte, I Lombardi alla prima crociata (Verdi)
- Paris, La belle Hélène (Offenbach)
- Pinkerton, Madama Butterfly (Puccini)
- Rinuccio, Gianni Schicchi (Puccini)
- Rodolfo, La bohème (Puccini)
- Roméo, Roméo et Juliette (Gounod)
- Tamino, The Magic Flute (Mozart)
- Thaddeus, The Bohemian Girl (Balfe)
- Tito, La clemenza di Tito (Mozart)
- Werther, Werther (Massenet)
- Wilhelm Meister, Mignon (Thomas)

=== Spinto ===
The spinto tenor has the brightness and height of a lyric tenor, but with a heavier vocal weight enabling the voice to be "pushed" to dramatic climaxes with less strain than the lighter-voice counterparts. Spinto tenors have a darker timbre than lyric tenors, but not so dark as many dramatic tenors. The German equivalent of the Spinto Fach is the Jugendlicher Heldentenor, which encompasses many of the dramatic tenor roles as well as some Wagner roles such as Lohengrin and Stolzing. The difference is often the depth and metal in the voice where some lyric tenors age or push their way into singing as a Spinto giving them a lighter tone and a Jugendlicher Heldentenor tends to be either a young heldentenor or true lyric spinto. Spinto tenors have a range from approximately the C one octave below middle C (C_{3}) to the C one octave above middle C (C_{5}).

Spinto tenor roles in operas:

- Andrea Chénier, Andrea Chénier (Giordano)
- Calaf, Turandot (Puccini)
- Des Grieux, Manon Lescaut (Puccini)
- Don Carlo, Don Carlos (Verdi)
- Don José, Carmen (Bizet)
- Erik, Der fliegende Holländer (Wagner)
- Ernani, Ernani (Verdi)
- Gustavo, Un ballo in maschera (Verdi)
- Hermann, Queen of Spades (Tchaikovsky)
- Macduff, Macbeth (Verdi)
- Manrico, Il trovatore (Verdi)
- Mario Cavaradossi, Tosca (Puccini)
- Max, Der Freischütz (Weber)
- Pollione, Norma (Bellini)
- Radames, Aida (Verdi)
- Stiffelio, Stiffelio (Verdi)
- Turiddu, Cavalleria rusticana (Mascagni)

=== Dramatic ===
Also called "tenore robusto", the dramatic tenor has a ringing and powerful sound. The dramatic tenor's approximate range is from the B one octave below middle C (B_{2}) to the B one octave above middle C (B_{4}) with some able to sing up to the C one octave above middle C (C_{5}). Many dramatic tenors though have historically avoided the coveted high C in performance. Their lower range tends to extend into the baritone tessitura, o, a few notes below the C_{3}, even down to A♭_{2}. Some dramatic tenors have a rich and dark tonal colour to their voice (such as the mature Enrico Caruso) while others (like Francesco Tamagno) possess a bright, steely timbre.

Dramatic tenor roles in operas:

- Canio, Pagliacci (Leoncavallo)
- Dick Johnson, La fanciulla del West (Puccini)
- Don Alvaro, La forza del destino (Verdi)
- Enée, Les Troyens (Berlioz)
- Florestan, Fidelio (Beethoven)
- Otello, Otello (Verdi)
- Samson, Samson et Dalila (Saint-Saëns)
- Peter Grimes, Peter Grimes (Britten)

=== Heldentenor ===
The heldentenor (English: heroic tenor) has a rich, dark, powerful and dramatic voice. As its name implies, the heldentenor vocal Fach features in the German romantic operatic repertoire. The heldentenor is the German equivalent of the tenore drammatico, however with a more baritonal quality: the typical Wagnerian protagonist. The keystone of the heldentenor's repertoire is arguably Wagner's Siegfried, an extremely demanding role requiring a wide vocal range and great power, plus tremendous stamina and acting ability. Often the heldentenor is a baritone who has transitioned to this Fach or tenors who have been misidentified as baritones. Therefore, the heldentenor voice might or might not have facility up to high B or C. The repertoire, however, rarely calls for such high notes.

Heldentenor roles in operas:

- Florestan, Fidelio (Beethoven)
- Tannhäuser, Tannhäuser (Wagner)
- Lohengrin, Lohengrin (Wagner)
- Siegmund, Die Walküre (Wagner)
- Siegfried, Siegfried (Wagner)
- Siegfried, Götterdämmerung (Wagner)
- Walther von Stolzing, Die Meistersinger von Nürnberg (Wagner)
- Tristan, Tristan und Isolde (Wagner)
- Parsifal, Parsifal (Wagner)
- Aegisth, Elektra (Richard Strauss)
- Bacchus, Ariadne auf Naxos (R. Strauss)
- The Emperor, Die Frau ohne Schatten (R. Strauss)
- Menelaus, Die ägyptische Helena (R. Strauss)
- Apollo, Daphne (R. Strauss)
- Drum Major, Wozzeck (Berg)
- Paul, Die tote Stadt (Korngold)
- The Stranger, Das Wunder der Heliane (Korngold)
- Mao Tse-Tung, Nixon in China (Adams)

=== Tenor buffo or spieltenor ===
A Tenor buffo or spieltenor is a tenor with good acting ability and the ability to create distinct voices for his characters. This voice specializes in smaller comic roles. The range of the tenor buffo is from the C one octave below middle C (C_{3}) to the C one octave above middle C (C_{5}). The tessitura of these parts ranges from lower than other tenor roles to very high and broad. These parts are often played by younger tenors who have not yet reached their full vocal potential or older tenors who are beyond their prime singing years. Only rarely will a singer specialize in these roles for an entire career. In French opéra comique, supporting roles requiring a thin voice but good acting are sometimes described as trial, after the singer Antoine Trial (1737–1795); examples are found in the operas of Ravel and in The Tales of Hoffmann.

Tenor buffo or spieltenor roles in operas:

- Count Danilo Danilovitsch, The Merry Widow (Lehár)
- Don Basilio, The Marriage of Figaro (Mozart)
- Mime, Der Ring des Nibelungen (Wagner)
- Don Anchise/ Il Podestà, La finta giardiniera (Mozart)
- Monostatos, The Magic Flute (Mozart)
- Pedrillo, Die Entführung aus dem Serail (Mozart)
- Slender, The Merry Wives of Windsor (Nicolai)
- John Styx, Orpheus in the Underworld (Offenbach)
- Prince Paul, La Grande-Duchesse de Gérolstein (Offenbach)
- Kálmán Zsupán, The Gypsy Baron (Johann Strauss II)
- The Captain, Wozzeck (Berg)
- The Magician, The Consul (Menotti)
- Beppe, Pagliacci (Leoncavallo)
- Frantz, The Tales of Hoffmann (Offenbach)
- Spoletta, Tosca (Puccini)
- Goro, Madama Butterfly (Puccini)
- Pong, Turandot (Puccini)
- Gastone, La traviata (Verdi)
- Roderigo, Otello (Verdi)
- Dr. Caius, Falstaff (Verdi)
- Gherardo, Gianni Schicchi (Puccini)
- King Kaspar, Amahl and the Night Visitors (Menotti)
- Triquet, Eugene Onegin (Tchaikovsky)
- The Holy Fool, Boris Godunov (Mussorgsky)
- Pasquale, Orlando paladino (Haydn)
- Platon Kuzmich Kovalev, The Nose (Shostakovich)

== Other uses ==
There are four parts in barbershop harmony: bass, baritone, lead, and tenor (lowest to highest), with "tenor" referring to the highest part. The tenor generally sings in falsetto voice, corresponding roughly to the countertenor in classical music, and harmonizes above the lead, who sings the melody. The barbershop tenor range is middle C to A one octave above middle C, though it is written an octave higher. The "lead" in barbershop music is equivalent to the normal tenor range.

In bluegrass music, the melody line is called the lead. Tenor is sung an interval of a third above the lead. Baritone is the fifth of the scale that has the lead as a tonic, and may be sung below the lead, or even above the lead (and the tenor), in which case it is called "high baritone".

== See also ==
- Category of tenors
- Fach system for voice classification
- List of tenors in non-classical music
- Voice classification in non-classical music
