= Die Schule der Frauen (opera) =

1957 German-language opera by Rolf Liebermann

Die Schule der Frauen is a 1957 German-language opera by Rolf Liebermann after Molière's The School for Wives.

The opera was premiered as a one-act work, The Wives School, in English in Kentucky in 1955.

The full three-act German version of the opera premiered at the Salzburg Festival in 1957 with Walter Berry as Molière (Jean-Baptiste Poquelin) who sits on the stage giving commentary but also plays three roles himself. The rest of the cast include Kurt Böhme as Arnolphe, Anneliese Rothenberger as Agnes, Christa Ludwig as Georgette, Nicolai Gedda as Horace, and Alois Pernerstorfer as Oronte, with the Vienna Philharmonic conducted by George Szell. A recording was made and was issued by Orfeo, then reissued by Line.
