= Le postillon de Lonjumeau =

1836 opera by Adolphe Adam

- Opéra-comique by Adolphe Adam
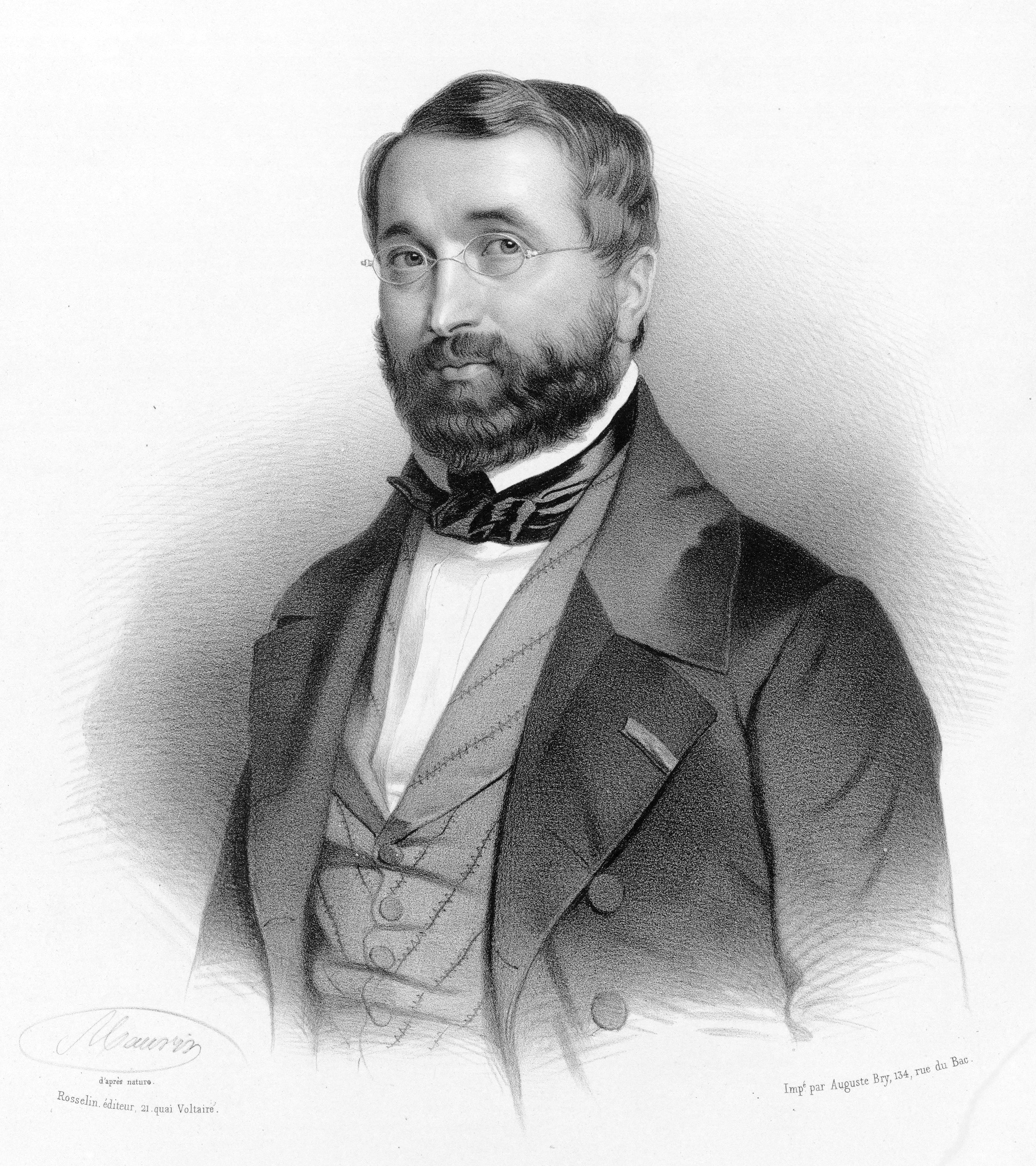
- Adam in 1850
- Librettist: Adolphe de Leuven; Léon Lévy Brunswick
- Language: French
- Premiere: 13 October 1836; Opéra-Comique, Paris

Le postillon de Lonjumeau (The Postillion of Lonjumeau) is an opéra comique in three acts by Adolphe Adam to a French libretto by Adolphe de Leuven and Léon Lévy Brunswick.

The opera has become the most successful of Adam's works, and the one by which (apart from his ballet Giselle and his Christmas carol "Cantique de Noël") he is best known outside his native France. The opera is "in the mainstream of French opera comique, jam-packed with Gallic style and charm and musically quite sophisticated, with parody and pastiche lightly touched in". The well-known tenor Act one aria ('ronde') "Mes amis, écoutez l'histoire" includes the demanding high D, or D5, at the end.

== Performance history ==
The opera was premiered by the Opéra-Comique at the Salle de la Bourse in Paris on 13 October 1836. Performances followed at the St James's Theatre, London, on 13 March 1837, and in New Orleans at the Théâtre d'Orléans on 19 April 1838.

Recent productions have been mounted in the Berlin Staatsoper Unter den Linden (from 4 August 2000) and at the Grand Théâtre, Dijon, (from 30 March 2004 conducted by Philippe Cambreling, with Isabelle Poulenard (Madeleine / Madame de Latour). The latter was a co-production of Opéra Paris-Sud and Opéra de Dijon. The work was performed in Paris for the first time in 125 years in a new production at the Opéra-Comique in March 2019 with Michael Spyres in the title role, in a production by Michel Fau. Sébastien Rouland conducted, with Florie Valiquette as Madeleine.

== Roles ==
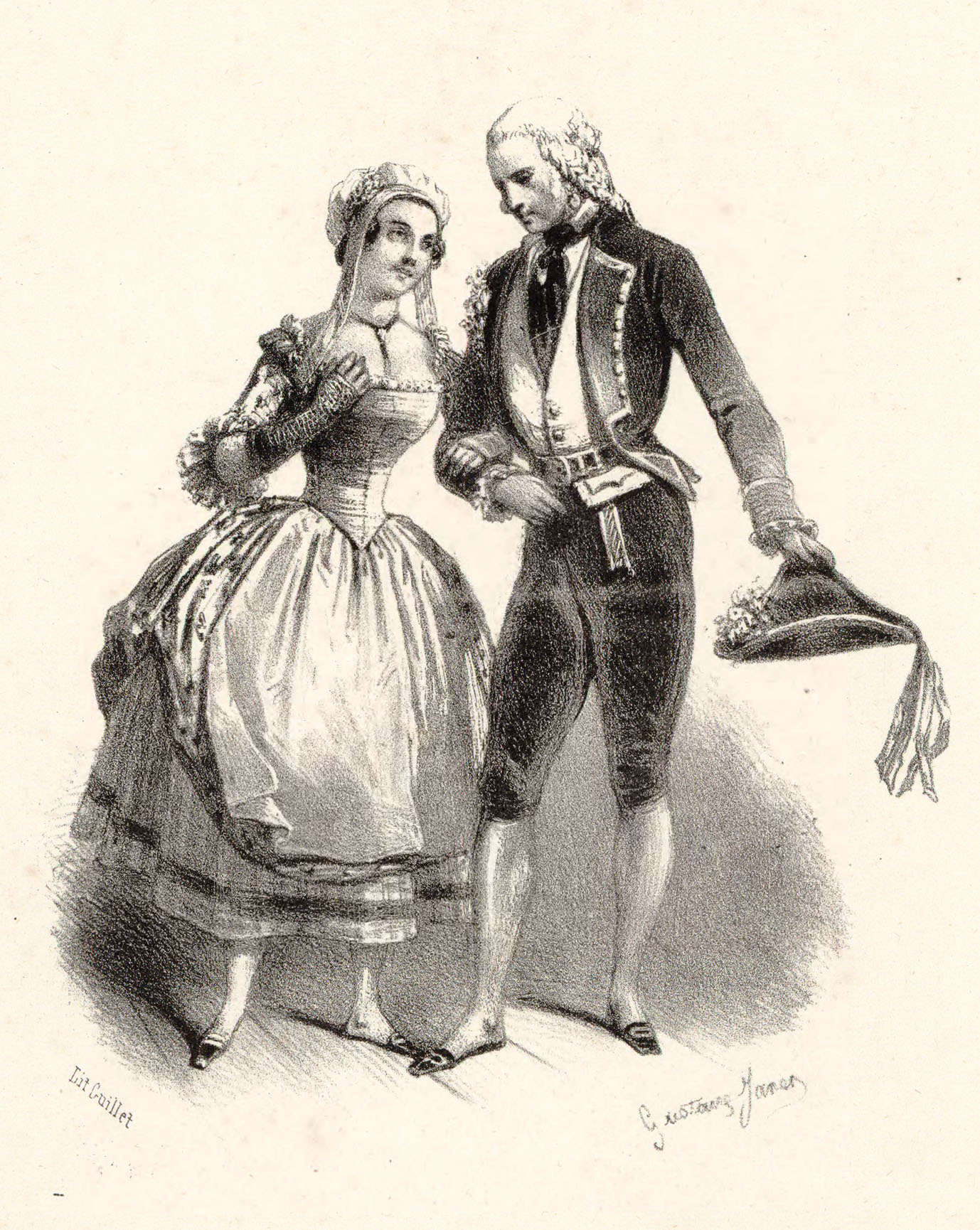
Prévost and Chollet as Madeleine and Chapelou

Roles, voice types, premiere cast
Role	Voice type	Premiere cast, 13 October 1836 Conductor: Henri Valentino
Madeleine, Chapelou's wife	dramatic coloratura soprano	Geneviève-Aimé-Zoë Prévost
Rose	light-lyric soprano or soubrette	Mme Roy
Chapelou, a coachman	tenor	Jean-Baptiste Chollet
Le Marquis de Corcy, head of the Paris Opéra	baritone	Achille Ricquier
Biju, Chapelou's friend	bass-baritone	François-Louis Henry
Bourdon	bass	M. Roy
Chorus

== Synopsis ==
Act 1 Chapelou, the just-wedded postillion, or horse-backed coach-guider (cf. coach-mounted coachman), and his innkeeper wife Madeleine decide to consult a clairvoyant to ensure that their marriage will be joyous. The latter foresees however that it will not go smoothly without indicating exactly what will occur when.

At first alarmed, the couple soon banish anxiety in order to enjoy their wedding night. Days into the marriage the Marquis de Corcy, who is director of the Paris Opera, arrives at the couple's inn and is immediately smitten by Madeleine, but doesn't say anything to her. Later he overhears Chapelou singing his usual song with other guests and is impressed by his voice. He decides to invite the young postillion to join the opera company, but they must leave immediately. Excitedly Chapelou asks his friend Biju to tell Madeleine where he has gone and why. Then he and the Marquis depart leaving Madeleine in shock.

Act 2 Ten years later. Madeleine has come into an inheritance and is known as Madame Latour; Chapelou is an opera star. One evening the Marquis holds a post-performance cast reception to which he has invited Latour. Upon meeting her, Chapelou falls in love, not recognising the wife he abandoned. He proposes, she accepts, and a wedding occurs.

Act 3 The Marquis has informed the police and denounced this apparent bigamy. On the wedding night Madeleine appears in her old peasant clothes and Chapelou now recognises her. She then transforms before his eyes into Latour, the heiress. When the Marquis arrives with the police, she reveals her deception to all: the couple have married twice and vow from that day on to love like good village people. This induces a hearty response from the chorus to provide a stirring finale.

== Film ==
In 1936 the opera was loosely adapted into an Austrian-Swiss comedy film The Postman from Longjumeau directed by Carl Lamac.

== Recordings ==
- (Sung in German) Reinhard Peters conducting the RIAS Orchestra and Chorus with Stina-Britta Melander (Madeleine), John van Kesteren (Chapelou), Ernst Krukowski (Marquis de Corey), Ivan Sardi (Bijou), and Fritz Hoppe (Bourdon). Eurodisc 300 073-420 (two records). Used as sound track of television film - cut.
- 17–25 September 1985, Salle Garnier, Monte-Carlo : Thomas Fulton conducting the Orchestre philharmonique de Monte-Carlo, with John Aler (Chapelou / Saint-Phar), François Le Roux (de Corcy), Jean-Philippe Lafont (Biju / Alcindor), June Anderson (Madeleine / Madame de Latour), Daniel Ottewaere (Bourdon), Balvina de Courcelles (Rose). (EMI 557106-2)
- DVD: 2020, filmed at the Opéra-Comique, Paris : Sébastien Rouland conducting the Orchestre de l'Opéra de Rouen Normandie and Accentus chorus, with Michael Spyres (Chapelou/Saint-Phar), Florie Valiquette (Madeleine/Madame de Latour), Franck Leguérinel (Le Marquis de Corcy), Laurent Kubla (Biju/Alcindor), Julien Clément (Bourdon), Michel Fau (Rose). Naxos Cat: NBD0112V
