= Deaths in October 1985 =

The following is a list of notable deaths in October 1985.

Entries for each day are listed alphabetically by surname. A typical entry lists information in the following sequence:

- Name, age, country of citizenship at birth, subsequent country of citizenship (if applicable), reason for notability, cause of death (if known), and reference.

== October 1985 ==
=== 1 ===
- William Allen, 66, Canadian politician.
- J. Grant Anderson, 88, Scottish theatre director and actor.
- Warren Ashby, 65, American philosopher.
- Michele Avila, 17, American murder victim, drowned.
- Barney Brown, 77, American baseball player.
- Bland Cox Bruns, 84, American politician, member of the Louisiana House of Representatives (1950–1956).
- Terry Duffy, 63, British trade unionist.
- George Gooma, 67, Australian cricketer.
- Charlotte Posenenske, 54, German artist.
- Ninian Sanderson, 60, Scottish racing driver, leukemia.
- Bill Springsteen, 85, American football player.
- Gordon Strutt, 73, English Anglican prelate.
- Giovanni Tosi, 86, Italian Olympic sprinter (1920).
- Earl Vann, 71, American politician, member of the Pennsylvania House of Representatives (1967–1976).
- Kong Visudharomn, 78, Thai physical educator.
- Emil Vogel, 91, German general.
- E. B. White, 86, American author (Charlotte's Web, Stuart Little, The Trumpet of the Swan), complications from Alzheimer's disease.

=== 2 ===
- Harry Bohrer, 69, Czechoslovak journalist (Der Spiegel), heart failure.
- Rebecca Caudill, 86, American author (Tree of Freedom).
- Sidney Clute, 69, American actor (Cagney & Lacey, McCloud), cancer.
- Noel Cox, 74, American politician.
- Rock Hudson, 59, American actor (Giant, Pillow Talk, McMillan & Wife), AIDS.
- Salomón Ibarra Mayorga, 98, Nicaraguan lyricist ("Salve a ti, Nicaragua").
- Eric Jones, 70, English footballer.
- Alex Möller, 82, German politician.
- George Savalas, 60, American actor (Kojak), leukemia.
- Daramyn Tömör-Ochir, 64, Mongolian politician, murdered.

=== 3 ===
- Charles Collingwood, 68, American journalist, cancer.
- Maurice Copeland, 74, American actor.
- Harry Cowans, 52, British politician, MP (since 1976).
- Arthur Froehlich, 76, American architect, cancer.
- John Pallett, 64, Canadian politician, MP (1954–1962).
- Yngve Stoor, 73, Swedish singer.

=== 4 ===
- Josie Bennett, 82, American rodeo manager.
- Arthur J. Bidwill, 82, American politician, member of the Illinois Senate (1934–1935, 1938–1972).
- Princess Eudoxia of Bulgaria, 87, Bulgarian royal.
- Fred Foster, 39, American basketball player.
- Enzo Giudici, 65, Italian literary scholar.
- Norm Harris, 79, Australian footballer.
- Jozef Herda, 75, Czechoslovak Olympic wrestler (1936).
- François Hertel, 80, Canadian Olympic writer (1948).
- Ludvig Lindblom, 75 Swedish Olympic wrestler (1932, 1936).
- Franklin Merrell-Wolff, 98, American esoteric philosopher.
- Laurence Reavell-Carter, 71, English Olympic discus thrower (1936, 1948).
- Jim Robertson, 82, Australian footballer.
- Geoffrey Sladen, 81, English rugby player and naval officer.
- Werner Stark, 75, Austrian-English sociologist.
- Gleb Strizhenov, 60, Soviet actor.
- Frederic Virtue, 88, British Olympic boxer (1920).
- Trond Halvorsen Wirstad, 81, Norwegian politician.

=== 5 ===
- Caroline Bancroft, 85, American journalist.
- Harald Cramér, 92, Swedish mathematician.
- Cyril Edge, 68, English cricketer.
- Joachim Helbig, 70, German fighter pilot, traffic collision.
- Glynn Isaac, 47, South African archaeologist.
- Serge Jaroff, 89, Russian-born American choir conductor (Don Cossack Choir).
- Ben Jeby, 75, American boxer.
- Brian Keenan, 42, American drummer (The Chambers Brothers), heart attack.
- Joseph Kushner, 62, Polish-born American real estate developer.
- Liang Xingchu, 72, Chinese general.
- Karl Menger, 83, Austrian-American mathematician.
- Vic Nankervis, 66, Australian footballer.
- Lothar Wolfgang Nordheim, 85, German-born American theoretical physicist.
- Sayyid Ahmedullah Qadri, 76, Indian writer.
- Walter Wallace Sackett Jr., 79, American politician, member of the Florida House of Representatives (1972–1976).
- Abdus Sattar, 79, Bangladeshi politician, president (1981–1982).
- Holbrook Working, 90, American economist.

=== 6 ===
- Torsten Aminoff, 75, Finnish politician.
- Roy Atkins, 77, Australian footballer.
- Fred Colledge, 70, Scottish cricketer.
- Enrique Fernández, 73, Uruguayan footballer.
- Lola Gjoka, 75, Albanian pianist.
- Walter Gordy, 76, American physicist.
- Jack Harkness, 78, Scottish footballer.
- Vilém Klíma, 79, Czechoslovak electrical engineer.
- Lauri Kokkonen, 67, Finnish playwright.
- James Chalmers McRuer, 95, Canadian judge.
- Nelson Riddle, 64, American songwriter and composer, heart and kidney failure.
- Martha Schlamme, 62, Austrian-born American actress and singer, complications from a stroke.
- Karl Zischek, 75, Austrian footballer.

=== 7 ===
- Leopold Bode, 91, Austrian footballer.
- Frank Curran, 75, Australian rugby player.
- Lucile Czarnowski, 90, American dance educator.
- Albert Downs, 80, Australian footballer.
- Joe Flanagan, 87, Australian footballer.
- Leroy Holmes, 72, American baseball player.
- John A. Kent, 71, Canadian-English flying ace.
- Wolfgang Kieling, 61, German actor.
- Kaare Langlo, 72, Norwegian meteorologist.
- Dmitry Lukyanov, 85, Soviet general.
- Noah Mozes, 73, Israeli newspaper publisher.
- Cemal Reşit Rey, 80, Turkish pianist and composer.
- Gordon Arthur Riley, 74, American marine biologist.
- Silvestre Vargas, 83, Mexican mariachi musician.
- Len Webster, 78, Australian footballer.

=== 8 ===
- Riccardo Bacchelli, 94, Italian writer.
- Kenneth Bagshaw, 64, Australian cricketer.
- Roger Blough, 81, American steel executive.
- William L. Borden, 65, American congressional staffer (United States Congressional Joint Committee on Atomic Energy), heart attack.
- Subby Byas, 75, American baseball player.
- Diatome, 23, British Thoroughbred racehorse.
- Amalia Celia Figueredo, 90, Argentine aviator.
- Theresa Harris, 78, American actress.
- Marcelino Huerta, 60, American football player and coach, heart attack.
- Leon Klinghoffer, 69, American businessman, shot.
- Marta Lynch, 60, Argentine writer, suicide.
- Pedro Mathey, 57, Peruvian Olympic cyclist (1948).
- August Mortelmans, 84, Belgian racing cyclist.
- Malcolm Ross, 68, American balloonist.
- Giorgio Santelli, 87, Italian-American Olympic fencer (1920).
- Francesco Saverio Starrabba Barbera, 84, Italian lawyer and politician.
- John Wesley Snyder, 90, American businessman and politician, secretary of the treasury (1946–1953).
- Clive Sullivan, 42, Welsh rugby player, cancer.
- Gordon Welchman, 79, English-American mathematician.

=== 9 ===
- John Kameaaloha Almeida, 87, American musician.
- Cecil Closenberg, 78, South African cricketer.
- Ludo Coeck, 30, Belgian footballer, complications from a traffic collision.
- Karel De Baere, 60, Belgian racing cyclist.
- Lionel George Higgins, 94, British lepidopterist.
- Edward Highton, 61, English cricketer.
- Dar Hutchins, 69, American basketball player.
- Manuel Flores Leon Guerrero, 70, Guamanian politician, governor (1963–1969).
- Emílio Garrastazu Médici, 79, Brazilian politician, president (1969–1974), kidney failure.
- Rusty Yarnall, 82, American baseball player.

=== 10 ===
- S. S. Apte, 78, Indian journalist.
- Vera Bogetti, 83, British actress.
- Yul Brynner, 65, Russian-born American actor (The Ten Commandments, The King and I, The Magnificent Seven), lung cancer.
- Bettina Ehrlich, 82, Austrian-English painter and illustrator.
- Hedley Powell Jacobs, 81, English-Jamaican journalist and writer.
- Alice Melin, 85, Belgian politician.
- Doris Reynolds, 86, British geologist.
- Don Schlundt, 52, American basketball player.
- Suvadhana, 80, Thai royal, princess consort (1925).
- David Van Alstyne, 88, American politician, member of the New Jersey Senate (1943–1953), heart attack.
- Hans Vatne, 62, Norwegian newspaper editor.
- Orson Welles, 70, American actor, director (Citizen Kane, Touch of Evil), and broadcaster ("The War of the Worlds"), heart attack.

=== 11 ===
- Frank G. Anderson, 93, American football player and coach.
- Todd Andrews, 84, Irish public servant.
- Blanche Charlet, 87, French Allied spy.
- Viktor Gurjev, 71, Estonian opera singer.
- Jussi Jalas, 77, Finnish composer.
- Alex La Guma, 61, South African novelist, heart attack.
- Sew Leeka, 78, American basketball player.
- Edward Lowinsky, 77, American musicologist.
- Ted Mitchell, 80, American football player.
- Ingvard Nørregaard, 71, Danish Olympic canoeist (1952).
- Alex Odeh, 41, Palestinian peace activist, assassination by bombing.
- Dorothy O'Grady, 87, English saboteur.
- Bernard Privat, 70, French writer.
- Elwood Ullman, 82, American writer.
- Tex Williams, 68, American singer ("Smoke! Smoke! Smoke! (That Cigarette)"), pancreatic cancer.

=== 12 ===
- Blind John Davis, 71, American musician.
- Duke Dinsmore, 72, American racing driver.
- Paul DuCharme, 68, American basketball player.
- Grant Heckenlively, 69, American football player and coach.
- Norman James, 77, English footballer.
- Judy Lee Klemesrud, 46, American journalist, breast cancer.
- Numa F. Montet, 93, American politician, member of the U.S. House of Representatives (1929–1937).
- Johnny Olson, 75, American radio and television announcer (The Price Is Right, What's My Line?, Match Game), stroke.
- Sergei Osipov, 70, Soviet artist.
- Victor Salazar, 74, American politician.
- Ricky Wilson, 32, American guitarist (The B-52s), AIDS.

=== 13 ===
- Herb Aach, 62, German-born American painter.
- Maurice Austin, 68, Australian soldier and military historian.
- Francesca Bertini, 93, Italian actress.
- Mieczysław Boruta-Spiechowicz, 91, Polish general.
- Tage Danielsson, 57, Swedish actor and comedian, skin cancer.
- Paolo De Stefano, unknown, Italian mobster, murdered.
- Theodore Epp, 78, American radio evangelist.
- Sir Neville Faulks, 77, English barrister
- Richard E. Ferrario, 54, American politician, member of the Minnesota Senate (1959–1964).
- Pierre-Étienne Guyot, 80, French sports executive.
- Calvin D. Johnson, 86, American politician, member of the U.S. House of Representatives (1943–1945).
- Eiji Kanie, 43, Japanese actor and voice actor, stroke.
- Florence Luscomb, 98, American architect and suffragist.
- Saul Mielziner, 80, American football player.
- Herbert Nebe, 86, German racing cyclist.
- Tassos, 71, Greek engraver.
- Jack Wilson, 64, Australian cricketer.

=== 14 ===
- Ossie Bluege, 84, American baseball player and manager, stroke.
- Kenneth Diplock, Baron Diplock, 77, British barrister.
- Artur Dyson, 73, Portuguese footballer.
- Harry Friedauer, 58, German singer and actor.
- Parimal Ghosh, 68, Indian politician and diplomat, MP (1967–1971).
- Emil Gilels, 68, Soviet pianist.
- Paul B. Johnson Jr., 69, American politician, governor of Mississippi (1964–1968), heart attack.
- Ludwig Landen, 76, German Olympic canoeist (1936).
- Emil Naclerio, 70, American surgeon.
- Doris Odlum, 95, English psychiatrist.
- Sir Gerald Reece, 88, British colonial administrator, governor of British Somaliland (1948–1954).
- Mustafa Selimov, 75, Soviet politician and civil rights activist.
- Floyd E. Shurbert, 84, American politician.
- Pál Teleki, 79, Hungarian footballer.
- Edwin B. Wheeler, 67, American general, heart attack.

=== 15 ===
- Sandro Angiolini, 65, Italian cartoonist.
- Alice C. Browning, 77, American writer.
- Bruno Fattori, 94, Italian poet.
- Gus Rivers, 75, Canadian ice hockey player (Montreal Canadiens).
- Frank Shoofey, 44, Canadian lawyer, shot.
- Ted Steele, 68, American bandleader.
- Damon Wetzel, 74, American football player.
- Max Zaslofsky, 59, American basketball player and coach, leukemia.

=== 16 ===
- Khalekdad Chowdhury, 78, Bangladeshi writer.
- Antoni Gronowicz, 72, Polish-American novelist, heart attack.
- James Hutton, 79, Scottish rugby player.
- Sir Bruce Levy, 93, New Zealand botanist.
- Franklin Milton, 78, American sound engineer (Ben-Hur, Doctor Zhivago, How the West Was Won).
- Archie McQuilken, 52, Northern Irish cricketer, traffic collision.
- George Odey, 85, British politician and businessman, MP (1947–1955).
- Fred L. Peterson, 89, American politician, mayor of Portland, Oregon (1953–1957).
- Alexander Doniphan Wallace, 80, American mathematician.
- Burton Wilkinson, 85, American-born English cricketer.
- Paul A. Zahl, 75, American biologist.

=== 17 ===
- Trevor Aston, 60, British historian, drug overdose.
- Omero Bonoli, 76, Italian Olympic gymnast (1932).
- Asbjørn Engen, 67, Norwegian newspaper editor.
- John Ericksen, 82, American Olympic skier (1932).
- Jimmy Fowler, 70, Canadian ice hockey player.
- Ottar Gravås, 63, Norwegian politician.
- Helmi Juvonen, 82, American artist, diabetes.
- Wiktor Kemula, 82, Polish electrochemist.
- Simone Le Bargy, 108, French actress.
- Peeter Pedaja, 54, Estonian-born Australian sculptor and sailor, liver failure.
- Abdelmunim Rifai, 68, Jordanian politician, prime minister (1969, 1970).
- Joseph Rosenstock, 90, Polish-American conductor.
- Bud Sheely, 64, American baseball player.

=== 18 ===
- Stefan Askenase, 89, Polish-Belgian pianist.
- George Darling, 80, British politician, MP (1950–1974).
- Medardo Galli, 78, Italian Olympic rower (1928).
- Bryn Jones, 73, Welsh footballer.
- Jack Kent, 65, American cartoonist (King Aroo), leukemia.
- Benjamin Moloise, 30, South African poet and political activist, execution by hanging.
- Prince Philipp of Saxe-Coburg and Gotha, 84, Austrian royal.
- K. R. Ramsingh, 70, Indian actor.
- Tish Sommers, 71, American author and feminist, cancer.
- Jun Tazaki, 72, Japanese actor.
- Janwillem van den Berg, 64, Dutch speech scientist.

=== 19 ===
- Jean-Roger Caussimon, 67, French singer and actor.
- Anton Christoforidis, 68, Greek boxer, heart attack.
- Charlie Hazelton, 68, Australian rugby league footballer.
- Lincoln LaPaz, 88, American astronomer.
- Aage Nielsen-Edwin, 87, Danish sculptor.
- Alfred Rouleau, 70, Canadian businessman.
- Johnny Williams, 79, American drummer.

=== 20 ===
- Granny Alston, 77, English cricketer.
- Hal Goldsmith, 87, American baseball player.
- Abraham M. Halpern, 71, American linguist and anthropologist.
- Knut Hultgren, 75, Norwegian actor.
- Mary Aquinas Kinskey, 91, American religious sister and pilot, heart attack.
- Knud Børge Overgaard, 67, Danish footballer.
- Jean Riboud, 65, French oil executive, cancer.
- Kirio Urayama, 54, Japanese filmmaker.
- Harry Wragg, 83, British jockey and horse trainer.

=== 21 ===
- Victor Barthélemy, 79, French political activist.
- Creed Burlingame, 80, American naval admiral.
- Florence Jaffy, 68, American economist.
- Jens Lambæk, 86, Danish Olympic gymnast (1920).
- Masuiyama Daishirō I, 65, Japanese sumo wrestler.
- Hillman Howard Sersland, 79, American politician, member of the Iowa House of Representatives (1952–1965).
- Diane Thomas, 39, American screenwriter (Romancing the Stone), traffic collision.
- Dan White, 39, American politician and convicted murderer (Moscone–Milk assassinations), suicide by carbon monoxide poisoning.

=== 22 ===
- Anthony T. Augelli, 83, American judge.
- Leo Baron, 69, British lawyer and jurist.
- Arthur Coadou, 88, French WW1 flying ace.
- Edward William Day, 84, American judge.
- Dorothy Hartley, 92, English social historian and author (Food in England).
- Les Hughson, 78, Australian footballer.
- Albena Lake-Hodge, 64-65, Anguillan politician and educator.
- Norbert Poehlke, 34, German serial killer, suicide by gunshot.
- Stefano Satta Flores, 48, Italian actor and dubber (Star Wars, Alien), leukemia.
- Viorica Ursuleac, 91, Romanian singer.
- Richard G. Weede, 74, American general.
- Xu Shiyou, 78-79, Chinese general.

=== 23 ===
- Bernhard Bauknecht, 85, German politician.
- Thena Mae Farr, 57, American rodeo rider.
- Robert George, 92, French ice hockey player.
- Norman Lind, 64, Norwegian-British military officer, plane explosion.
- Mario Prassinos, 69, French writer and painter.
- Don Quartermain, 77, Australian footballer.
- Bruno Gustav Scherwitz, 89, German politician.
- John Greenlees Semple, 81, British mathematician.
- Barbara Thorne Stevenson, 75, American singer.
- Merle Watson, 36, American guitarist, traffic collision.
- Martin Wierstra, 57, Dutch racing cyclist.

=== 24 ===
- László Bíró, 86, Hungarian-Argentine inventor of the ballpoint pen.
- Gábor Bódy, 39, Hungarian filmmaker.
- Richie Evans, 44, American racing driver, racing crash.
- Muhammad Mustafa Jauhar, 90, Pakistani religious scholar.
- William Rudolph Kanne, 72, American physicist.
- Wilhelm Klemm, 89, Polish chemist.
- Masaichi Nagata, 79, Japanese film producer (Rashomon, Gamera, the Giant Monster).
- Daniele Pace, 50, Italian composer and songwriter, heart attack.
- Maurice Roy, 80, Canadian Roman Catholic cardinal.
- Hermann Teuber, 91, German painter.

=== 25 ===
- Brian Barker, 77, British journalist.
- Felixberto Camacho Flores, 64, Guamanian Roman Catholic prelate.
- Morton Downey, 83, American singer, stroke.
- Ann Forrest, 90, Danish-born American actress.
- Jimmy Frew, 90, Scottish footballer.
- Gary Holton, 33, British musician (Heavy Metal Kids), drug overdose.
- Huub Huizenaar, 76, Dutch Olympic boxer (1924).
- Doug Johnstone, 82, Australian footballer.
- Blair Lee III, 69, American politician, acting governor of Maryland (1977–1979), lung cancer.
- Viktor Makeyev, 61, Soviet rocket scientist.
- Olier Mordrel, 84, French Breton nationalist and Nazi collaborator.
- Ludwig Ott, 79, German theologian.
- Hans Trauttenberg, 76, Austrian ice hockey player.
- Fritz Konrad Ernst Zumpt, 77, German entomologist.

=== 26 ===
- Cecil Langley Doughty, 71, British illustrator.
- Sheldon Fitts, 85, American football player and lawyer.
- Emilio Guinea, 78, Spanish botanist.
- Dimitri Jorjadze, 87, Georgian aristocrat, hotelier and racing driver.
- Kikuko Kawakami, 81, Japanese writer.
- Liu Woying, 78-79, Chinese politician.
- Neil O'Reilly, 60, Australian footballer.
- Svetozar Popović, 83, Yugoslav footballer.
- Mieczysław Połukard, 55, Polish racing cyclist, racing collision.
- Bob Scheffing, 72, American baseball player and manager.
- J. Norman Shade, 83, American politician, member of the Illinois House of Representatives (1954–1970)
- Louis Weichardt, 91, South African politician and fascist organizer (South African Gentile National Socialist Movement).

=== 27 ===
- Thomas Townsend Brown, 80, American electrical engineer.
- Andreas Gruentzig, 46, German cardiologist, plane crash.
- Robert Jephson Jones, 80, British soldier.
- Tola Mankiewiczówna, 85, Polish singer and actress.
- William C. Perry, 85, American jurist.
- Walter Segal, 78, German-English architect.
- Phoney Smith, 80, American football player.
- Kurt Vogel, 97, German mathematics historian.

=== 28 ===
- William McPherson Allen, 85, American aviation executive, complications from Alzheimer's disease.
- William Bramley, 57, American actor.
- Elga Brink, 80, German actress.
- Eric Coy, 74, Canadian Olympic discus thrower (1948).
- Harold Davies, Baron Davies of Leek, 81, British politician, MP (1945–1970) and member of the House of Lords (since 1970).
- Joseph L. Donovan, 92, American politician.
- Arletta Duncan, 70, American actress.
- Horace Gillom, 64, American football player, heart attack.
- Leslie Harris, 70, Welsh cricketer.
- Carry Hauser, 90, Austrian painter and stage designer.
- Joachim Knychała, 33, Polish serial killer, execution by hanging.
- Ruby Hart Phillips, 86, American journalist.
- Axel Thue, 81, Norwegian actor.
- Ángel Zubieta, 67, Spanish footballer, amyotrophic lateral sclerosis.
- Fritz Zwicky, 92, Swiss composer and clarinetist

=== 29 ===
- Sjur Bygd, 96, Norwegian novelist.
- Michael Carey, 70, English Anglican priest.
- Robert Edward Chambliss, 81, American terrorist (16th Street Baptist Church bombing).
- Charles Douglas-Home, 48, Scottish journalist, cancer.
- Lucien Dugas, 87, Canadian politician.
- Evgeny Lifshitz, 70, Soviet physicist.
- John Davis Lodge, 82, American politician, diplomat and actor, governor of Connecticut (1951–1955), member of the U.S. House of Representatives (1947–1951), heart attack.
- Lola Prusac, 90, Polish-born French fashion designer.
- Alice Roberts, 79, Belgian actress.
- Pavle Stefanović, 84, Yugoslav writer and philosopher.

=== 30 ===
- Lucien Berthelot, 81, French philatelist.
- Edgar Bruun, 80, Norwegian racewalker.
- Aimé Dossche, 83, Belgian racing cyclist.
- Kirby Grant, 73, American actor (Sky King), traffic collision.
- Vic Grigg, 64, Canadian ice hockey player.
- Raul Hellberg, 84, Finnish racing cyclist.
- Nils Hjelmtveit, 93, Norwegian educator and politician.
- Fazle Lohani, 56, Bangladeshi journalist and television presenter.
- David Oxley, 64, English actor, stroke.
- Guy Pentreath, 83, British Anglican priest and academic administrator.

=== 31 ===
- Ellis Ashton, 65, English theatre historian.
- Nikos Engonopoulos, 78, Greek painter.
- Frank Handley, 75, English Olympic runner (1936).
- Harry N. Jonah, 89, Canadian politician.
- Qanate Kurdo, 76, Soviet philologist.
- Hardit Malik, 90, Indian diplomat.
- John H. Michaelis, 73, American general, heart failure.
- Poul Reichhardt, 72, Danish actor.
- Bill Schwartau, 59, American recording engineer.
- Bill Spokes, 72, Australian footballer.
- Jamasie Teevee, 75, Canadian Inuk artist.
- Rosalie Van der Gucht, 77, British-South African theatre director.
