= Highton (surname) =

Highton is a surname. Notable people with the surname include:

- Edward Highton (1924–1985), English cricketer
- Elena Highton de Nolasco (born 1942), Argentine lawyer and judge
- Hec Highton (1923–1985), Canadian ice hockey player
- Henry Highton (1816–1874), English schoolmaster, clergyman and writer
- Jack Highton (1904–1988), British Royal Navy admiral
- Paul Highton (born 1976), Welsh rugby league player
- Richard Highton (born 1927), American herpetologist
