= Highton (disambiguation) =

Highton is a suburb of Geelong, Victoria, Australia

Highton may also refer to:

- Highton (surname)
- Highton Glacier, a glacier of the South Shetland Islands
- Highton (Saga of the Skolian Empire)
- Highton, Pennsylvania
