= Langlo (surname) =

Langlo is a surname. Notable people with the surname include:

- Jenny Langlo (born 1993), Norwegian singer
- Kaare Langlo (1913–1985), Norwegian meteorologist
- Kristian Langlo (1894–1976), Norwegian politician
- Oddbjørn Sverre Langlo (1935–2004), Norwegian politician
