= Joe Flanagan =

Joe Flanagan may refer to:

- Joe Flanagan (soccer), American soccer coach
- Joe Flanagan (footballer) (1898–1985), Australian rules footballer
- Joe Flanagan, accordionist, see Flanagan Brothers

== See also ==
- Joe Flanigan (born 1967), American television actor
