= Lyle Downs =

Australian rules footballer

Personal information
- Full name: Lyle Ernest Downs
- Nickname: Packet
- Born: 26 July 1896; Carlton, Victoria
- Died: 7 July 1921 (aged 24); Princes Park, Carlton, Victoria
- Original team: Clifton Hill Juniors
- Position: Rover

Playing career^{1}
Years	Club	Games (Goals)
1917–21	Carlton	47 (31)
- ^{1} Playing statistics correct to the end of 1921.

Lyle Ernest Downs (26 July 1896 – 7 July 1921) was an Australian rules footballer who played with Carlton in the Victorian Football League (VFL).

== Family ==
The son of John Downs (1862-1933), and Felicia (a.k.a. Valetia) Downs (1867-1945), née Messina, Lyle Ernest Downs was born at Carlton, Victoria on 26 July 1896. One of his brothers, John Downs (1890–1975), and one of his cousins, Tommy Downs (1901-1981), also played VFL football with Carlton; another of his cousins, Albert Downs (1905–1985), played VFL football with Collingwood.

== Education ==
He was educated at the Alfred Crescent State School, in North Fitzroy.

== Football ==
Downs, who also played for the Carlton Cricket Club as a wicket-keeper and batsman, was a rover and played in the semi-finals in each of his first three seasons. He played for Carlton with his brother John, against Collingwood, at Victoria Park, on 19 June 1920, when John played his only game for Carlton.

== Death ==
During the third quarter of the match against Richmond, at Princes Park on 28 June 1919 Downs "left the field with a strained heart, and it is not likely that he will play again". Six rounds later he returned to the field, and played against St Kilda, at Princes Park, on 23 August 1919.

After a training session at Princes Park on 7 July 1921, Downs (aged 24) collapsed and died in the training room of a heart attack.

On the previous Saturday [2 July 1921], in the match against Collingwood, he had received a severe bump on the shoulder, which had not thoroughly recovered during the week. He was in the act of getting the injured shoulder massaged when he suddenly fell forward and died without speaking. Two years ago, acting on medical advice, Downs ceased playing, as his heart was over-strained. However, he played again at the latter end of the [1919] season, being apparently quite sound in health. Evidently his heart had not thoroughly recovered." — Jack Worrall, The Australasian, 16 July 1921.

He was buried at the Melbourne General Cemetery on 10 July 1921.
