= Olney High School =

- U.S. National Register of Historic Places
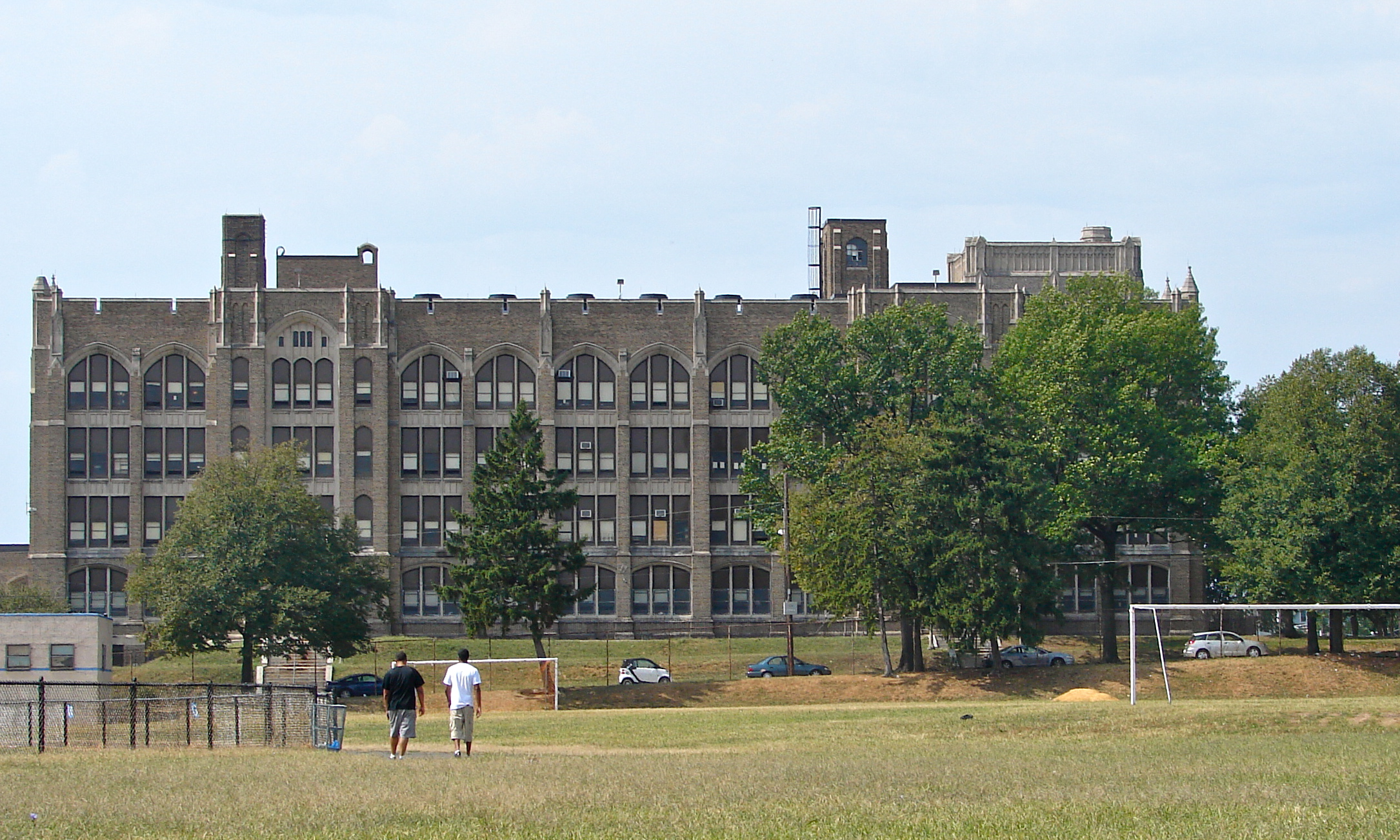
- Olney High School in September 2010

- Location within Philadelphia Location within Pennsylvania Location within the United States
- Location: 100 West Duncannon Ave., Philadelphia, Pennsylvania, U.S.
- Coordinates: 40°01′43″N 75°07′26″W
- Area: 3 acres (1.2 ha)
- Built: 1929–1930
- Architect: Irwin T. Catharine
- Architectural style: Late Gothic Revival, Academic Gothic
- MPS: Philadelphia Public Schools TR
- NRHP reference No.: 86003312
- Added to NRHP: December 4, 1986

The Olney High School, formerly the Aspira Charter School at Olney, is a public high school that is located in the Olney section of Philadelphia, Pennsylvania.

Previously part of the School District of Philadelphia, it was originally split into two schools Olney East and Olney West before becoming a singular charter high school in 2011; however, it reverted to a public high school beginning with the 2022-2023 school year and rejoined the School District of Philadelphia.

It was added to the National Register of Historic Places in 1986.

== History and architectural features ==
The original historic building was designed by Irwin T. Catharine and was built between 1929 and 1930. It is a five-story brick building that sits on a granite base with a five-story tower. Designed in the Late Gothic Revival style, it features Gothic arched openings and limestone details.

== Alumni ==
- Clair Blank, former author, Beverly Gray mystery series
- Danilo Burgos, politician
- Leon Eisenberg, former child and social psychiatrist
- Lee Elia, former Cubs and Phillies manager
- Del Ennis, former professional baseball player, Chicago White Sox, Cincinnati Reds, Philadelphia Phillies, and St. Louis Cardinals
- Marvin Hewitt, imposter who worked as a physics professor without any university or high school degrees
- Florence Jaffy, former economist and researcher
- Bernie Lemonick, former football player and coach
- Raymond G. Perelman, former philanthropist
- Jerry Ross, former songwriter, record producer, and founder of Heritage Records
- Debra Sledge, singer, eldest sister and founding member of Sister Sledge
- Joni Sledge, former singer and founding member of Sister Sledge
- Kathy Sledge, singer and founding member of Sister Sledge
- Kim Sledge, singer and founding member of Sister Sledge
- Al Spangler, former professional baseball player, Chicago Cubs, Houston Astros, Los Angeles Angels, and Milwaukee Braves
- Gregory Tony, Broward County, Florida sheriff
