= Allan Quartermain (footballer) =

Australian rules footballer

Personal information
- Full name: Allan Richard Quartermain
- Born: 10 December 1913; Hawthorn, Victoria
- Died: 13 July 1985 (aged 71); Kew, Victoria
- Original team: Frankston
- Height: 175 cm (5 ft 9 in)
- Weight: 72 kg (159 lb)

Playing career^{1}
Years	Club	Games (Goals)
1932	Hawthorn	2 (0)
- ^{1} Playing statistics correct to the end of 1932.

Allan Richard Quartermain (10 December 1913 – 13 July 1985) was an Australian rules footballer who played for the Hawthorn Football Club in the Victorian Football League (VFL).

== Personal life ==
He was the younger brother of Fitzroy player Don Quartermain.
