= Norwegian Meteorological Institute =

National meteorological service of Norway

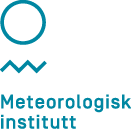

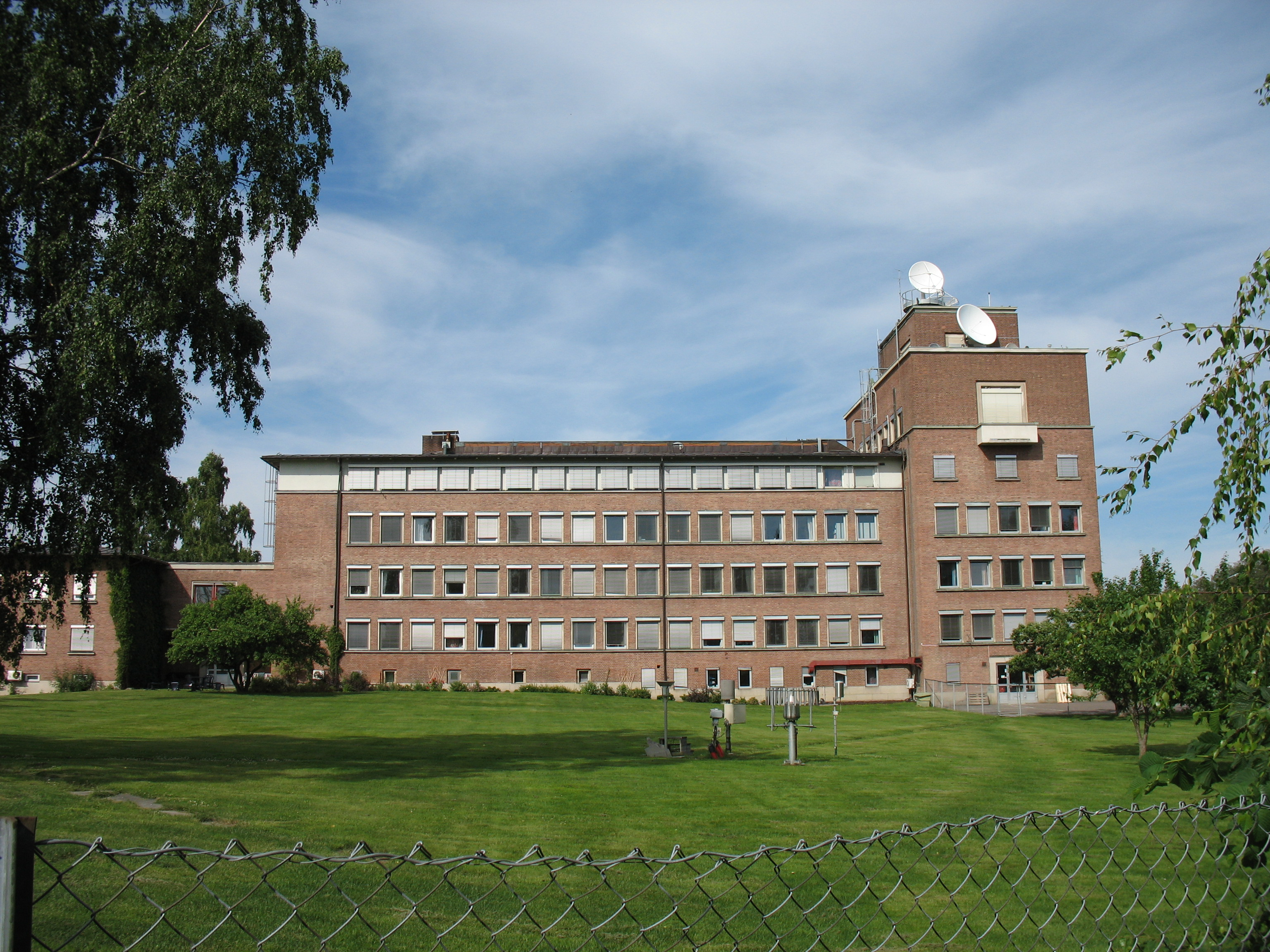
- Headquarters in Oslo.
- Established: 1 December 1866 (159 years ago)
- Headquarters: Oslo
- Country: Norway
- Coordinates: 59°56′33″N 10°43′16″E
- Parent organisations: Ministry of Climate and Environment
- Affiliations: World Meteorological Organization, European Centre for Medium-Range Weather Forecasts, EUMETSAT
- Website: www.met.no

The Norwegian Meteorological Institute (Norwegian: Meteorologisk institutt), also known internationally as MET Norway, is Norway's national meteorological institute. It provides weather forecasts for civilian and military uses and conducts research in meteorology, oceanography and climatology. It is headquartered in Oslo and has offices and stations in other cities and places. It has around 500 full-time staff and was founded in 1866.

== History ==
The institute was founded on 1 December 1866 with the help of Norwegian astronomer and meteorologist Henrik Mohn who served as its director until 1913. He is credited with founding meteorological research in Norway. The abbreviation MET Oslo or MET OSLO has been used internationally for a long time; the World Meteorological Organization for example recommended in 1956 that its members standardized references to this institute as MET OSLO.

== Activities ==
The institute has around 500 employees and some 650 part-time observers around the country. It also operated the last remaining weather ship in the world, MS Polarfront, stationed in the North Atlantic, until it was discontinued due to budgetary issues on 1 January 2010 and replaced with satellite and buoy data.

The institute represents Norway in international organizations like the World Meteorological Organization (WMO), the European Centre for Medium-Range Weather Forecasts (ECMWF), and EUMETSAT. The institute is also partner to a number of international research and monitoring projects including EMEP, MyOcean, MyWave and the North West Shelf Operational Oceanographic System (NOOS).

== Services ==
The institute with its three branches in Oslo, Bergen and Tromsø provides weather forecasts for Norway and Norwegian waters as well as more specialized services such as ice monitoring, oil spill and search and rescue forecast services. Marine forecasts of sea state parameters are issued both commercially to oil companies and more generally for the public. The institute also provides data for the free online service yr.no, launched in 2007, which provides weather forecasts for some 7 million places in the world.

== Observational network ==
The institute is responsible for maintaining, quality checking, archiving and updating the observational network consisting of automated weather stations, radiosondes and weather radars. The marine observations of wave height and other oceanographic parameters gathered by petroleum platforms in Norwegian waters are also archived by the institute.

== Forecast models ==
The institute produces operational weather forecasts using different numerical weather prediction models including the Unified Model and HIRLAM. The forecasts are subject to modifications introduced by human forecasters before being issued. The institute also runs a suite of operational ocean models ranging in resolution from 20 km to less than 1 km. The model suite currently comprises both the Princeton Ocean Model (POM) as well as the more recent Regional Ocean Modeling System (ROMS). The wave model WAM has been in operational use since 1998 on a number of grid resolutions ranging from 50 km down to 4 km while the SWAN model has been implemented for coastal high-resolution (less than 1 km grid resolution) applications.

== Directors of MET Norway ==
- Henrik Mohn (1866–1913)
- Aksel Steen (1914–15)
- Hans Theodor Hesselberg (1915–55)
- Ragnar Fjørtoft (1955–78)
- Kaare Langlo (1978–83)
- Arne Grammeltvedt (1984–98)
- Anton Eliassen (1998–2016)
- Roar Skålin (2017– )

== See also ==
- yr.no
