= Yr.no =

Norwegian weather forecasting website

yr.no
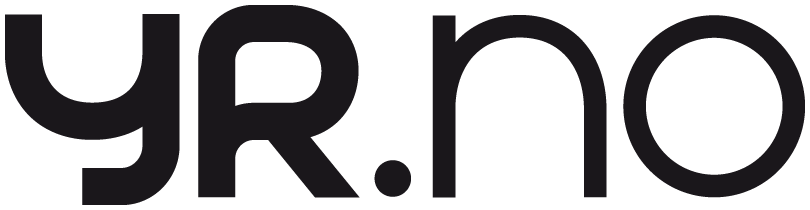

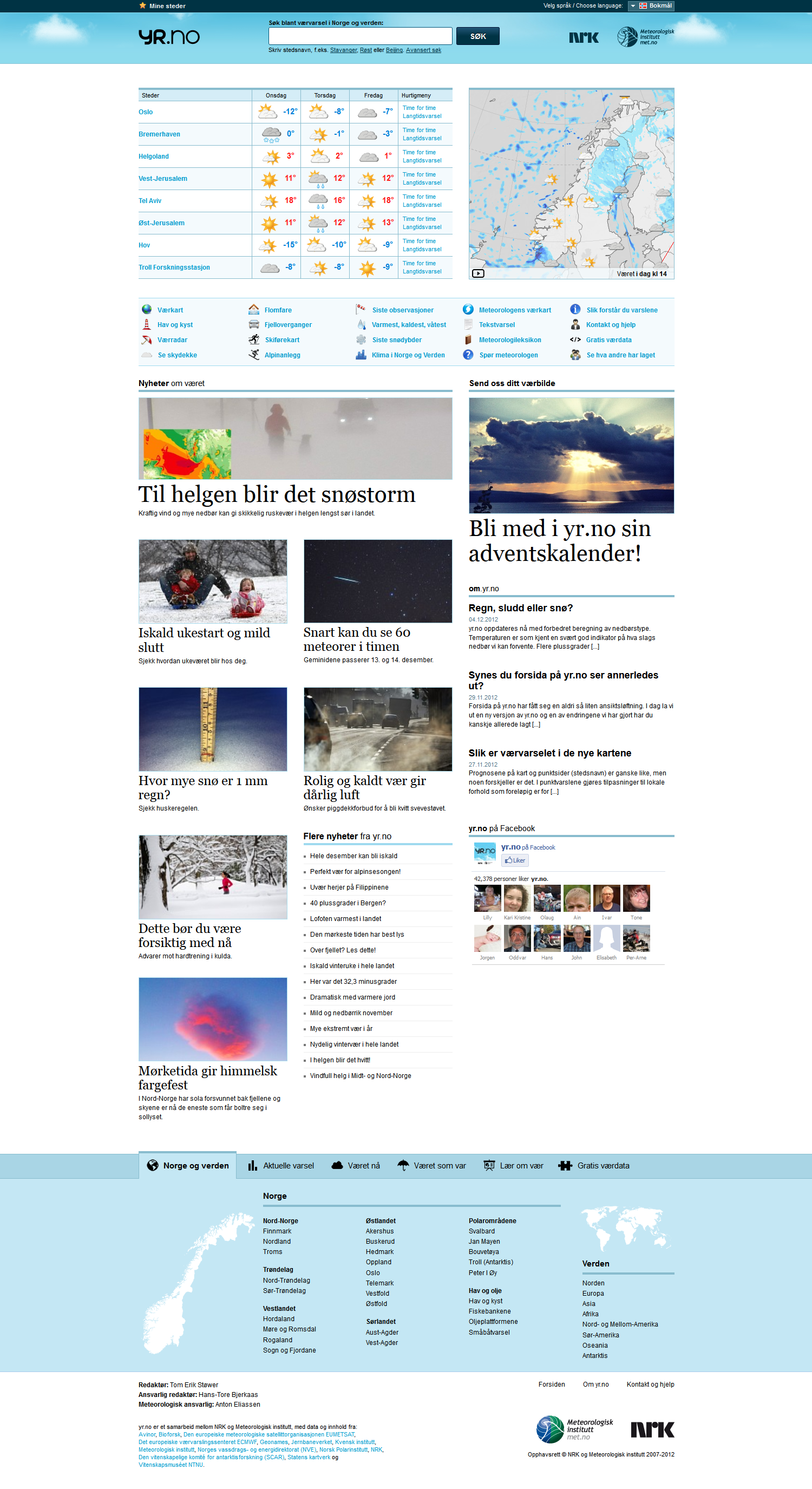
- Website type: Weather forecasts
- Available in: Norwegian (Bokmål and Nynorsk), Kven, Northern Sami, English
- Owners: Norwegian Broadcasting Corporation and the Norwegian Meteorological Institute
- Website: www.yr.no
- Commercial: No
- Registration: 2007
- Launched: September 19, 2007
- Current status: Active

yr.no is a Norwegian website and a mobile app for weather forecasting and dissemination of other types of meteorological information hosted by the Norwegian Broadcasting Corporation (NRK) in collaboration with the Norwegian Meteorological Institute. The website was launched in September 2007.

The word yr means drizzle in Norwegian.

== Weather models and updating frequency ==
Yr.no generates weather forecasts for millions of places around the world. Its 3-day forecast uses two different weather models with a 2.5 km resolution in Scandinavia and the Norwegian islands, and for other places, the ECMWF's IFS model in high-resolution configuration (HRES), with a 9 km resolution.

For the 10-day forecast, yr.no employs the ECMWF-ENS model with an 18 km resolution for Norwegian territories, and for the rest of the world, IFS-HRES with a 9 km resolution.

Outside Scandinavia, the 3-day forecasts are updated every six hours, and the 10-day forecasts every 12 hours.

== Information sources ==
In addition to data from the Norwegian Meteorological Institute, yr.no uses open data from various collaborators such as

- European Organisation for the Exploitation of Meteorological Satellites
- GeoNames
- The Norwegian Polar Institute

It also collects information from different types of private weather stations.
