= 1919 Mississippi College Collegians football team =

American college football season

1919 Mississippi College Collegians football
- Conference: Southern Intercollegiate Athletic Association
- Record: 3–5–1 (0–4 SIAA)
- Head coach: Frank G. Anderson (1st season)
- Home stadium: Provine Field

1919 Southern Intercollegiate Athletic Association football standings
| | Conf. | | | | | Overall |
| Team | W | | L | | T | W | | L | | T |
|---|---|---|---|---|---|---|---|---|---|---|
| Auburn $ | 5 | – | 1 | – | 0 | 8 | – | 1 | – | 0 |
| Alabama | 6 | – | 1 | – | 0 | 8 | – | 1 | – | 0 |
| Centre | 1 | – | 0 | – | 0 | 9 | – | 0 | – | 0 |
| Kentucky | 3 | – | 1 | – | 1 | 3 | – | 4 | – | 1 |
| Georgia Tech | 3 | – | 1 | – | 0 | 7 | – | 3 | – | 0 |
| Tulane | 3 | – | 1 | – | 1 | 6 | – | 2 | – | 1 |
| Vanderbilt | 3 | – | 1 | – | 2 | 5 | – | 1 | – | 2 |
| Furman | 2 | – | 1 | – | 1 | 6 | – | 2 | – | 1 |
| Mississippi A&M | 5 | – | 2 | – | 0 | 6 | – | 2 | – | 0 |
| Georgia | 4 | – | 2 | – | 2 | 4 | – | 2 | – | 3 |
| LSU | 3 | – | 2 | – | 0 | 6 | – | 2 | – | 0 |
| Clemson | 3 | – | 2 | – | 2 | 6 | – | 2 | – | 2 |
| Florida | 2 | – | 2 | – | 0 | 5 | – | 3 | – | 0 |
| Wofford | 1 | – | 1 | – | 0 | 3 | – | 2 | – | 1 |
| Transylvania | 1 | – | 1 | – | 0 | 2 | – | 4 | – | 0 |
| Ole Miss | 1 | – | 4 | – | 0 | 4 | – | 4 | – | 0 |
| The Citadel | 1 | – | 4 | – | 0 | 4 | – | 4 | – | 1 |
| Sewanee | 1 | – | 4 | – | 0 | 3 | – | 6 | – | 0 |
| Georgetown (KY) | 0 | – | 0 | – | 0 | 0 | – | 2 | – | 0 |
| Tennessee | 0 | – | 3 | – | 2 | 3 | – | 3 | – | 3 |
| South Carolina | 0 | – | 4 | – | 1 | 1 | – | 7 | – | 1 |
| Mercer | 0 | – | 1 | – | 0 | 0 | – | 2 | – | 0 |
| Mississippi College | 0 | – | 4 | – | 0 | 3 | – | 5 | – | 1 |
| Howard (AL) | 0 | – | 4 | – | 0 | 3 | – | 5 | – | 2 |
$ – Conference champion

The 1919 Mississippi College Collegians football team was an American football team that represented Mississippi College as a member of the Southern Intercollegiate Athletic Association (SIAA) during the 1919 college football season. In their first year under head coach Frank G. Anderson, the team compiled a 3–5–1 record.

== Schedule ==
| Date | Opponent | Site | Result | Source |
|---|---|---|---|---|
| October 4 | Chamberlain-Hunt Academy* | Provine Field; Clinton, MS | W 57–0 | |
| October 11 | at Mississippi A&M | New Athletic Field; Starkville, MS | L 7–56 | |
| October 18 | Jefferson College (MS)* | Provine Field; Clinton, MS | W 6–0 | |
| October 24 | at Ouachita* | Arkadelphia, AR | T 0–0 | |
| October 27 | at Hendrix* | Russell Field; Conway, AR | L 12–15 | |
| November 1 | at Tulane | Tulane Stadium; New Orleans, LA | L 0–49 | |
| November 8 | at LSU | State Field; Baton Rouge, LA | L 0–24 | |
| November 17 | at Mississippi Normal* | Kamper Park; Hattiesburg, MS | W 20–7 | |
| November 27 | vs. Ole Miss | Fair Grounds; Jackson, MS | L 0–6 | |
*Non-conference game
