= Marvin Hewitt =

American imposter

Marvin Harold Hewitt (March 24, 1922 – March 31, 1991) was an American impostor and physics professor who taught at five different universities despite never having earned a high school or any university degrees. His lies were uncovered multiple times, but Hewitt simply switched aliases and continued to masquerade as a physics Ph.D. at a new university. By the time he was publicly exposed at age 31 in national media, Hewitt had worked his way up to full professor, teaching graduate courses in theoretical physics, the theory of relativity, and electrical engineering. Little is known about the rest of his career.

In addition to made-up names, Hewitt adopted the names and identities of actual academics, such as Julius Ashkin, Clifford Berry, and Kenneth P. Yates, who worked on the other side of the country.

== Early life ==
Hewitt was born in Philadelphia on March 24, 1922, the son of Samuel Harrison Hurwitz, or Hewitt, who was 20, and his mother Anna Koff, age 18. Samuel worked as a police officer. At age 10, Hewitt read Functions of a Complex Variable at the library and became fascinated with books on advanced mathematics, later saying "I did not relate to other children. I was an isolate." He gave a classroom presentation on the theory of relativity that supposedly mystified his teacher and classmates. Hewitt later said, "I recognized myself as a brilliant child." He claimed to have mastered engineering as a teenager.

He attended Olney High School but did not find it stimulating, and quit at 17 without graduating. His father did not support his idea of pursuing higher education in mathematics and physics, and Hewitt spent the next six years working hard labor jobs in factories and freight yards. He later said, "The thought of taking courses in subjects in which I was already recognized as one of the nation’s leading authorities was ridiculous." During this time he entered contests in the local Philadelphia newspaper to provide the best solutions to social dilemmas, winning twelve times.

In World War II he was rejected by the United States Army and worked a civilian job with the Signal Corps that he described as being "boring as aitch" (a minced oath for Hell; Hewitt reportedly did not curse). He was so unhappy that he applied to be an eighth grade teacher at a new military school despite lacking qualifications. Despite applying with fake credentials, he was hired at age 23 and found success and satisfaction in the classroom. After one year the school shut down, and Hewitt was hired to be an aerodynamicist at an airplane factory after applying under the name of a prominent academic whose bio he found at the library. He quit after a month due to fears of being found out, realizing the man whose name he had chosen was too prominent.

== University physics professor ==
At the end of the summer, he called the Philadelphia College of Pharmacy and Science to inquire about physics instructor positions. He himself as "Julius Ashkin" and was hired part-time. The actual Julius Ashkin was a physicist of similar age who had studied at Columbia University and done research at the Los Alamos and the Argonne National Laboratories, who had just accepted a teaching position at the University of Rochester.

He was hired part-time, and Hewitt taught calculus, algebra and trigonometry with success; his students scored as well on exams as other instructors' classes. He later said to LIFE that he did not struggle with teaching: "Intellectually, it was like clerking. They gave me a copy of the textbook to be used and told me how much I was to cover during a semester. I mapped lessons and just tried to cover each lesson in a clear manner." He also supervised a physics laboratory despite having no laboratory experience at all.

At the end of the school year, Hewitt's father and another officer were shot and killed while on duty by a car thief. The incident became a local news story, and Hewitt's family home was surrounded by too many reporters and cameras for him to attend class for several days out of concern that he would be detected. Around this time, he applied for positions far from his hometown where no one knew his original identify, and the next school year he was hired to teach at the Bemidji State University teacher's college in Bemidji, Minnesota, as the only physicist in the department. However, he quickly grew tired of teaching undergraduate-level courses and pursued employment elsewhere.

He caught the attention of the head of the physics department at Saint Louis University, who requested an interview in person. Around this time, the actual Ashkin published a noteworhy paper in the Physical Review which listed his institutional affiliation as the University of Rochester. Hewitt declined the interview in case he was cornered with this evidence, and was eventually hired by mail. This was both a financial and professional advancement, with a $4000 salary and graduate-level courses in nuclear physics, statistical mechanical thermodynamics, and tensor analysis.

Though he was generally liked by his students and colleagues, some faculty noticed unusual gaps his basic physics understanding. He struggled to drive his car and had a "juvenile enthusiasm for science fiction". Hewitt became intensely nervous when one colleague returned from Argonne National Laboratory and told a story about meeting someone who knew Ashkin. To Hewitt's relief, they did not discuss the subject in enough detail to realize they each were referring to a different person. Additional stress came when the real Ashkin published another paper in the Physical Review that summer, leading Hewitt to mention to the department head that he listed himself at University of Rochester because it was where the research had taken place (even though this would go against convention).

== Promotion to full professor ==
Concerned about being found out, Hewitt reached out to other institutions, and soon received a generous offer for a full professor position at the University of Utah. The university had checked his references with no issue, receiving positive word from Los Alamos and Argonne as well as from Columbia University, where a dean confidently assured them that there had been two Ashkins including one now in the Midwest. They did not contact Rochester and therefore did not detect the duplicate Ashkin (who was still an assistant professor). Hewitt accepted the full professor position, and told his colleagues in Saint Louis that he was taking a job at General Electric for $10,000 per year.

In Utah, Hewitt taught exclusively graduate students. One day when walking with the department head, he failed to recognize an office clerk who excitedly said, "Dr. Ashkin!". He was unable to explain why he did not remember talking to her over the phone when he was in Rochester, leaving her confused. Several weeks later, a letter arrived from the real Julius Ashkin, addressed to "Dr. Julius Ashkin (?)". Upon receiving this letter Hewitt "almost fainted". Though Ashkin asked him to stop using the false name, he offered great understanding: "Let me assume that you are versed in theoretical physics and that you are fundamentally a decent man. I should then be willing to heIp you to relieve ourself of what must have become an almost unbearable burden. It is on these assumptions that I have decided not to take any immediate steps to notify any university office."

== Initial discovery and subsequent faculty positions ==
Nonetheless, Hewitt descended into panic for several days. He was soon summoned to the office of president A. Ray Olpin, who calmly informed him that university officials had reason to believe he was an impostor. Hewitt frantically denied these accusations until he was shown a letter of proof from a faculty member from Rochester. With great distress and shame, he admitted his real name and life story from his early days as a precocious child. The University of Utah kept the incident private out of respect for him, and offered him the option to remain a research fellow until he earned the degrees he had claimed to have. Meanwhile, the FBI was called to investigate potential national security risks of a nuclear physicist imposter, and following his clearance after 10 days, Hewitt fled to Philadelphia to recover from his shame and disgrace.

A Utah colleague story told Hewitt's story to Harvard astronomer Harlow Shapley, who was intrigued by his bizarre and remarkable achievements and arranged a meeting in New York City. Though Shapley was not finished with the discussion and wanted to introduce Hewitt to J. Robert Oppenheimer, then head of Princeton's Institute for Advanced Study, Hewitt refused, as he was skeptical of Shapley's intentions and afraid of public exposure.

By Spring 1954 Hewitt felt it was time to re-enter academia in a new field. He chose electrical engineering, after considering psychology, and created a made-up persona of "George Hewitt", a Johns Hopkins-educated head of research for RCA Corporation, which he submitted to a placement agency for faculty positions. He listed his address as a secretarial service near RCA headquarters in Camden, New Jersey. Within several weeks, Hewitt was hired to teach at the University of Arkansas College of Engineering. He moved with Estelle to Fayetteville, Arkansas. He found he disliked the name "George" and did not instinctually respond to it, in one instance failing to look as a colleague yelled "GEORGE!" repeatedly. He was found out when an RCA recruiter visited campus and had no idea who he was. Like before, Hewitt confessed everything, and the university quietly removed him from faculty.

He subsequently switched to the alias of philosophy professor Clifford Berry.

On February 1, 1953, Hewitt began his fifth faculty position as an assistant professor of physics at the University of New Hampshire, using false references and the identity of an Ohio State University academic named Kenneth Yates.

== Exposure and media attention ==
While teaching at the University of New Hampshire, Hewitt attracted the suspicion of a graduate student named Wayne Overman who noticed his "lack of knowledge in certain very specialized areas and his seeming lack of training in foreign languages" (doctorate degrees in engineering require German language courses). Overman discovered there were two academics named "Kenneth Yates" and alerted university officials. In a meeting with the assistant president and the physics department chair, Hewitt confessed to everything and was asked to resign. The assistant to the university president reportedly sought an psychiatric evaluation of Hewitt.

Hewitt left campus on January 31, 1954, and a national news story about his imposter career broke on March 4 and caused the university to be "besieged with phone calls" and "crank letters that protested the firing of ... a very capable instructor". A campus newspaper from March 1954 reads, "National reaction to the story has crystalized into a feeling of regret that anyone with such talent should be so misdirected as to use fraudulent names in order to achieve status and recognition."

In March 1954, Time reported that "the old compulsion is upon him" with a quote in which Hewitt said, "My record has been so phenomenal that some university might hire me. I am one of the top nuclear physicists in the country." Following the LIFE article, the Glenn L. Martin Company hired Hewitt as satellite design specialist, because vice president George Trimple Jr. felt that, according to LIFE magazine, "such obvious talent should not be wasted." Under his own name, Hewitt published a paper called "The Effect of the Earth’s Oblateness and Atmosphere on a Satellite Orbit" Little is known about the rest of his life.

== Personal life ==
Marvin Hewitt married Estelle LeSavoy in 1947, in Wilmington, Delaware. She was not initially aware of his double life, and struggled to maintain her husband's lies. "There was always tension," she said. According to Life, "she occasionally urged her husband to figure a way out of his nightmarish dilemma." She was nonetheless "well liked in the small, often jealous worlds of faculty society" and devoted herself to music. The couple had three boys. Hewitt said he refrained from vice like liquor, tobacco, and coffee, but indulged in candy bars. Prior to his highly-publicized exposure as a hoax, he read about a fellow imposter Ferdinand Demara in a magazine, later saying, "I thought about Demara’s case a long time ... I was very interested by it."

Hewitt died in Philadelphia on March 31, 1991, aged 69.
