= Antoni Gronowicz =

Polish-American author and poet (1913–1985)

- Born: Boleslaw Antoni Gronowicz; July 31, 1913; Rudnia, Poland
- Died: October 16, 1985 (aged 72); Avon, Connecticut, US
- Education: University of Lwow
- Occupations: Author, poet, playwright

Antoni Gronowicz (born Boleslaw Antoni Gronowicz, July 31, 1913 – October 16, 1985) was a Polish-American writer, poet, and playwright. He wrote eighteen books, of which many were biographies, notably Garbo: Her Story and God’s Broker: The Life of John Paul II as Told in his Own Words (both of which faced some controversies), nine plays, four books of poetry, and poems in many literary journals. Gronowicz is also known for his case before the Supreme Court on First Amendment rights.

== Early life in Poland ==
Gronowicz was born in Rudnia, Poland in 1912. Gronowicz began writing poems at a young age, winning Poland's National Poetry Prize in his teens. Gronowicz went on to college and graduated from the University of Lwow with a Doctor of Philosophy. After antisemitic violence at the University of Lwow that left one Polish Jew dead and many others injured, Gronowicz was invited to speak at the university in December 1937. Gronowicz's speech was later published as a book entitled Antisemitism is Destroying my Fatherland. He blamed Polish capitalists, Catholic sermons, and nationalist newspapers for antisemitic sentiment in Poland.

In 1938, Gronowicz won the Polish National Literary Award. He then traveled to the United States for speaking engagements throughout the country to discuss his work and to collect material to write a book on Polish Americans. His publication “Antisemitism is Destroying my Fatherland” and his organization of an anti-Nazi group in Poland, caused Gronowicz to be placed on the Nazi arrest list. On September 1, 1939, while Gronowicz was touring the United States, Germany invaded Poland. Gronowicz did not return to Poland during the war for fear of execution.

== Marriage and early career ==
During his lecture tour in New York City, Gronowicz met Sophie Shymanski, whom he married in 1940. They stayed in New York City for their entire lives and raised two children; Anthony was born in 1945 and Gloria in 1952. During this time Gronowicz wrote about Poland and the United States in works such as Bolek, a book about pre-war Poland and the escape of a Polish boy to the United States, and Four From the Old Town, a book about Lwow under Nazi occupation.

== Post-World War II career ==
After the war, Gronowicz continued writing books on Poland's history, including The Piasts of Poland, a chronicle of the Piast period of Poland, Gallant General: Tadeusz Kościuszko, a biography of the national hero of Poland and the United States, and Pattern for Peace, about Polish-German relations. Gronowicz also wrote Béla Schick and the World of Children, a biography of the famed pediatrician in 1954.

== Publications from 1973 to 1976 ==
In 1973, Gronowicz published the novel The Hookmen, which was about the very wealthy in the United States and the railroad industry.

His next book, titled Polish Profiles: The Land, the People, and Their History, was based on his travels to and from Poland. It was published in 1976.

== Controversy around “Garbo: Her Story” ==
Gronowicz met Greta Garbo, who reminded him of the well-known Polish actress Helena Modjeska, who specialized in Shakespearean and tragic roles. These acquaintances led him to write a biography of Modjeska titled Modjeska: Her Life and Loves, and a novel with a foreword by Greta Garbo titled An Orange Full of Dreams, which tells the story of a fictional world-famous, reclusive actress from Poland who lived in California. Later in 1990, after Gronowicz's and Garbo's death, a biography of Garbo titled Garbo: Her Story, written by Antoni Gronowicz, was published.

Garbo publicly denied that she ever knew or met Gronowicz and was not happy about a biography being written about her. Her friends and attorneys have called the book a hoax. Gronowicz stated to the press: “She thinks the book will damage her reputation. I had many interviews with her. She is trying to destroy me.”

In 1990, after the book was released, the estate of Garbo sued the book publisher. The matter was eventually settled out of court. The book was never edited or pulled from the shelves.

== God's Broker, Supreme Court and Death ==
During his travels in Poland, Gronowicz met Polish Cardinal Stefan Wyszynski and traveled with him to Rome in 1979 to meet The Pope, John Paul II. Gronowicz wrote the biography God's Broker: The Life of John Paul II as Told in His Own Words, published in 1984, based on interviews with the Pope arranged by the late Cardinal Stefan Wyszynski of Poland. This book became controversial due to the political climate in the United States and Gronowicz's writing concerning the assassination attempt on the Pope.

Twenty-one years after the attempt on his life, the Pope, in a gesture at clearing his conscience at remaining silent so many years about the egregious national slur to Bulgaria over stories that the Bulgarian government had supervised the attempted assassination, journeyed to Bulgaria to state unequivocally, stated: “I never believed in the so-called Bulgarian connection.”

Publisher Richardson & Snyder published Gronowicz's book in 1984. Soon after publication, Gronowicz brought a civil case against Philadelphia's ex-comptroller Tom Leonard, alleging he had reneged on a contract to produce a movie based upon the book. Four months after publication, the publisher withdrew the book, terming it as "fraudulent". The United States government subsequently convened a grand jury to investigate potential mail fraud. Gronowicz refused to comply with a judicial order to produce notes, travel records, correspondence and photographs collected while writing it.

His federal case represented the first time in United States history that an author other than a journalist was compelled to produce his sources. The Author's Guild, The Author's League, the Dramatist's Guild, the American Civil Liberties’ Union, as well as Burton Caine and Thomas Emerson, two of the top U.S. civil liberties’ scholars, protested this action on the grounds of free speech. Gronowicz won his appeal in February 1985 but the decision was reversed by the 3rd U.S. Circuit Court of Appeals in Philadelphia.

The Author's League, a 14,000-member national society of professional authors and dramatists, deplored a Court of Appeals ruling against Gronowicz because it “enormously expands the government’s power to subject the author of a dissenting or controversial work to a grand jury inquisition about the truth of his book, and to mail fraud prosecution under 18 U.S.C. Sec. 1341, by claiming it contains false factual statements and alleging these induced a publisher to issue the book.” The Authors League maintained that God's Broker was not defamatory, and that the government's actions of investigation and prosecution would have a chilling effect on authors’ freedom of expression.

The Philadelphia branch of the American Civil Liberties Union sided with Gronowicz, arguing the investigation was a threat to First Amendment rights.

In the meantime, Richardson & Snyder firm's principal partner, Julian Snyder, recalled God's Broker from all booksellers in the United States. He dissolved his joint publishing venture with fellow principal partner Stewart Richardson. Richardson disagreed with Snyder's decision and expressed a desire to sue Snyder for breach of contract.

Former United States Attorney General Ramsey Clark became Gronowicz's principal First Amendment lawyer in the federal case before the Supreme Court. ref 18

As the case wended its way to the Supreme Court, Gronowicz died of a heart attack. NY Times, October 19, 1985 Section 1 p. 32

During the case, one circuit judge filed a dissent, “Searching somewhat deeper into history, one could add Charles Darwin’s Origin of Species and the works of Galileo, all were seen in their time as threatening the views of the orthodoxy.”[22][24] The Washington Post editorialized that Gronowicz's case “is exactly the misuse of the government’s criminal investigative powers that the First Amendment was written to prevent.” ref 6

== Selected bibliography ==
- Gronowicz, A. (1938). Antysemityzm rujnuje moją ojczyznę: Uwagi do współczesnej rzeczywistości wygłoszone dnia 17 grudnia 1937 roku we Lwowie na zaproszenie Towarzystwa uniwersytetu robotniczego. Poland: Nakładem Dobrego Polaka.
- Gronowicz, A. (1941). Narodziny milosci Hitlera: Kompozycja powiesciowa. Philadelphia: Nakladem Jednsoci
- Gronowicz, A. (1942). Hitler's Wife. United States: Paramount Publishing Company.
  - Republished as Gronowicz, A. (1962). Hitler's Woman. London; Sydney, Australia: Horwitz Publications, Inc. Pty. Ltd.
- Gronowicz, A. (1942). Bolek (McEwen, J., Trans.). New York: T. Nelson and Sons.
- Gronowicz, A. (1943). Chopin (McEwen, J., Trans.). New York: T. Nelson.
- Gronowicz, A. (1943). Paderewski: Pianist and patriot. Montreal: Lucien Parizeau & Compagnie.
- Gronowicz, A. (1944). Four from the old town (Vetter, J., Trans.). New York: C. Scribner's Sons.
- Gronowicz, A. (1945). Tchaikovsky. Montreal: L. Parizeau & cie.
- Gronowicz, A. (1945). The Piasts of Poland. New York: Charles Scribner's Sons.
- Gronowicz, A. (1946). Sergei Rachmaninoff. United States: E. P. Dutton, Incorporated.
- Gronowicz, A. (1947). Gallant general: Tadeusz Kosciuszko. New York: C. Scribner's Sons.
- Gronowicz, A. (1951). Pattern for peace: The story of Poland and her relations with Germany. New York: Paramount Publishing
- Gronowicz, A. (1954). Béla Schick and the World of Children. United States: Abelard-Schuman.
- Gronowicz, A. (1956). Modjeska, Her Life and Loves. United States: T. Yoseloff.
- Gronowicz, A. (1972). An Orange Full of Dreams. United Kingdom: Dodd, Mead. ISBN 978-0-396-06424-4
- Gronowicz, A. (1973). The Hookmen. United Kingdom: Dodd, Mead. ISBN 978-0-396-06748-1
- Gronowicz, A. (1976). Polish profiles: the land, the people, and their history. Westport: L. Hill. ISBN 978-0-88208-060-4
- Gronowicz, A. (1984). God's Broker: The Life of John Paul II. United States: Richardson & Snyder. ISBN 978-0-943940-10-6
- Gronowicz, A. (1990). Garbo: Her Story. United Kingdom: Simon and Schuster. ISBN 978-0-7089-8600-4

== Plays ==
- Radosne Dosnyki
- The United Animals
- Shores of Pleasure Shores of Pain
- Chiseler's Paradise
- Forward Together
- Recepta
- Greta (unproduced)
- Rocos
- Colors of Conscience
- The League of Animals, A Fantasy, in One Hundred Non-Royalty Radio Plays compiled by William Kozlenko

== Poetry ==
- Melodia świtów: Poezje zebrine (1939)
- Prosto w oczy, translated as Straight in the Eye, Poland: Ludowa Spółdziełnia Wydawnicza. (1978)
- The Quiet Vengeance of Words, Reprinted from The Polish Review, Vol. Xiii, No.1, winter, pp. 66–94, New York, NY. (1968)
- Selected Polish Poems, translated by Antoni Gronowicz, reprinted as a booklet from The Polish Review, Vol. XVI, No. 3, Summer, 1971, pp. 79–86 and Vol XVII, No.2, Spring, 1972 pp. 78–85. Published by the Polish Institute of Arts and Sciences in America, Inc., (1972)
