= Vic Grigg =

Canadian ice hockey player (1921 – 1985)

- Born: March 25, 1921; Victoria Harbour, Ontario
- Died: October 30, 1985 (aged 64); Penetanguishene, Ontario
- Height: 5 ft 11 in (180 cm)
- Weight: 182 lb (83 kg; 13 st 0 lb)
- Position: Defense
- Shot: left
- Played for: Pittsburgh Hornets; Providence Reds; Springfield Indians; St. Louis Flyers
- Playing career: 1939–1953

Victor Carl Grigg (March 25, 1921 – October 30, 1985) was a Canadian professional hockey player who played for the Pittsburgh Hornets, Providence Reds, Springfield Indians and St. Louis Flyers in the American Hockey League.
