= Emilio Guinea =

Spanish botanist (1907–1985)

- Born: 13 May 1907; Bilbao
- Died: 26 October 1985 (aged 78); Madrid
- Occupation: botanist
- Scientific career
- Author abbrev. (botany): Guinea

Emilio Guinea López (13 May 1907 in Oleaveaga, Bilbao – 26 October 1985 in Madrid) was a Spanish botanist.

== Career ==
He graduated in 1929, and was awarded his doctorate in 1932 in Natural Sciences in the "Central University of Madrid" (now the Complutense University of Madrid.

He made numerous expeditions to tropical Africa, with an emphasis on Equatorial Guinea.

In 1957 he became Curator of the Royal Botanical Garden of Madrid.

Both his library and his personal herbarium were donated to the Royal Botanical Garden of Madrid, which named him Honorary Director.

== Some publications ==
- Guinea, Emilio (1944). La vegetación leñosa y los pastos del Sahara español [Woody vegetation and pastures of Spanish Sahara] (in Spanish). Madrid: Instituto Forestal de Investigaciones y Experienci.
- Guinea, Emilio (1945). Aspecto forestal del desierto [The forest in the desert] (in Spanish).
- Guinea López, Emilio (1945). España y el Desierto: Impresiones saharianas de un botánico español [Spain and the Desert: Saharan Impressions of a Spanish botanist] (in Spanish). Madrid: Instituto de Estudio Políticos.
- Guinea, Emilio (1947). En el país de los pámues. Relato ilustrado de mi primer viaje a la Guinea Española [In the land of the Pámues. Illustrated account of my first trip to Spanish Guinea] (in Spanish). Madrid: Instituto de Estudios Africanos.
- Guinea, Emilio (1949). En el Pais de los Bubis. Relato ilustrado de mi primer viaje a Fernando Poo [In the land of the Bubis. Illustrated account of my first trip to Fernando Poo] (in Spanish). Madrid: Instituto de Estudios Africanos.
- Guinea, Emilio (1949). Vizcaya y Su Paisaje Vegetal (Geobotánica Vizcaína) [Biscay and its natural vegetation (The geobotany of Biscay)] (in Spanish). Bilbao: Junta de Cultura de Vizcaya.
- Guinea, Emilio (1951). En el país de los Lapones. Relato ilustrado de mi primer viaje a Escandinávia [In the land of the Lapps. Illustrated account of my first trip to Scandinavia)] (in Spanish). Madrid: Instituto de Estudios Africanos.
- Guinea López, Emilio (1953). Geografía botánica de Santander. Esquema de la vegetación y flora santanderinas. La lucha contra las malas hierbas. El prado. Las buenas pratenses y su competencia con las malas forrajeras. Los bosques espontaneos. La vegetación fluvial [Botanical Geography of Santander. Outline of the local vegetation and flora. The fight against weeds. The meadow. The good pasture and its competition with the bad. Spontaneous reforestation. The riverine vegetation.] (in Spanish). Diputación Provincial de Santander.
- Guinea, Emilio (1954). El manzano en Santander [The apple tree in Santander] (in Spanish). Diputación Provincial de Santander.
- Guinea López, E.; Vidal Box, C. (1969). Parques y jardines de España. Árboles y arbustos [Parks and Gardens of Spain: trees and shrubs] (in Spanish). Madrid: Ministerio de Educacion.
- Guinea, Emilio (1980). Claves botánicas [Botanical keys] (in Spanish).

== Sources ==
- Teixidó, F. Biólogos Españoles, on line
