= Cecil Closenberg =

South African cricketer

Personal information
- Born: 27 August 1907; Brakpan, Transvaal Colony
- Died: 9 October 1985 (aged 78); Cape Town, Cape Province, South Africa
- Bowling: Right-arm medium-fast

Domestic team information
- Years: Team
- 1926/27–1934/35: Border
- 1936/37–1937/38: Eastern Province

Career statistics
Competition	First-class
Matches	22
Runs scored	292
Batting average	8.84
100s/50s	0/0
Top score	39
Balls bowled	3,162
Wickets	61
Bowling average	23.14
5 wickets in innings	4
10 wickets in match	0
Best bowling	5/47
Catches/stumpings	13/–
- Source: Cricinfo, 12 March 2023

Cecil Closenberg (27 August 1907 – 9 October 1985) was a South African cricketer. He played in 22 first-class matches for Border and Eastern Province from 1926/27 to 1937/38.

Closenberg was an opening bowler. His best first-class figures were 5 for 47 for Border in their victory over Eastern Province in December 1934.

Closenberg died on 9 October 1985. He is buried in the Jewish cemetery at Pinelands, Cape Town.
