= Frank G. Anderson =

American football player and coach (1891–1985)

Biographical details
- Born: December 19, 1891; Sparta, Tennessee, U.S.
- Died: October 11, 1985 (aged 93); Brazoria County, Texas, U.S.

Coaching career (HC unless noted)
- 1919: Mississippi College

Head coaching record
- Overall: 3–5–1

Frank Gist Anderson (December 19, 1891 – October 11, 1985) was an American college football coach. He served as the head football coach at Mississippi College in Jackson, Mississippi in 1909, compiling a record of 3–5–1.

== Head coaching record ==
Year	Team	Overall	Conference	Standing	Bowl/playoffs
Mississippi College Collegians (Southern Intercollegiate Athletic Association) (1919)
1919	Mississippi College	3–5–1	0–4		
Mississippi College:		3–5–1			
Total:		3–5–1			
