= Norm Harris =

Australian rules footballer, born 1906

Personal information
- Full name: Norman Cedric Harris
- Born: 11 September 1906; Collingwood, Victoria
- Died: 4 October 1985 (aged 79); Frankston, Victoria
- Height: 175 cm (5 ft 9 in)

Playing career^{1}
Years	Club	Games (Goals)
1929	Fitzroy	1 (1)
- ^{1} Playing statistics correct to the end of 1929.

Norman Cedric Harris (11 September 1906 – 4 October 1985) was an Australian rules footballer who played with Fitzroy in the Victorian Football League (VFL).
