= Kenneth Bagshaw =

Australian cricketer

Personal information
- Full name: Kenneth James Bagshaw
- Born: 23 October 1920; Kadina, South Australia
- Died: 8 October 1985 (aged 64); Watson, Australian Capital Territory
- Batting: Right-handed
- Bowling: Right-arm fast-medium
- Role: Batsman

Domestic team information
- Years: Team
- 1946/47–1947/48: South Australia

Career statistics
Competition	First-class
Matches	4
Runs scored	58
Batting average	8.28
100s/50s	0/0
Top score	27
Balls bowled	48
Wickets	1
Bowling average	11.00
5 wickets in innings	0
10 wickets in match	0
Best bowling	1/11
Catches/stumpings	0/–
- Source: Cricinfo, 24 April 2018

Kenneth James Bagshaw (23 October 1920 – 8 October 1985) was an Australian cricketer. He played four first-class matches for South Australia, three in 1946–47 and one during the following season.
