= Fred Colledge =

Scottish cricketer

Personal information
- Full name: Fred Colledge
- Born: 7 May 1915; Renfrew, Renfrewshire, Scotland
- Died: 6 October 1985 (aged 70); Paisley, Renfrewshire, Scotland
- Batting: Right-handed
- Bowling: Right-arm fast-medium

Domestic team information
- Years: Team
- 1949–1952: Scotland

Career statistics
| Competition | First-class |
|---|---|
| Matches | 4 |
| Runs scored | 21 |
| Batting average | 10.50 |
| 100s/50s | –/– |
| Top score | 12* |
| Balls bowled | 749 |
| Wickets | 6 |
| Bowling average | 44.50 |
| 5 wickets in innings | – |
| 10 wickets in match | – |
| Best bowling | 2/50 |
| Catches/stumpings | 2/– |
- Source: Cricinfo, 13 July 2022

Fred Colledge (7 May 1915 — 6 October 1985) was a Scottish first-class cricketer.

Colledge was born at Renfrew in May 1915. A club cricketer for Ferguslie Cricket Club, he made his debut for Scotland in first-class cricket against Yorkshire at Hull on Scotland's 1949 tour of England, where it was noted that his bowling kept Yorkshire's rate of scoring down during their first innings of 289 for 1 declared, which featured centuries by Len Hutton and Vic Wilson. He made three further first-class appearances for Scotland, playing in two matches in 1951 against Warwickshire and Northamptonshire, and one in 1952 against Yorkshire. Playing in the Scottish side as a right-arm fast-medium bowler, he took 6 wickets at an average of 44.50, with best figures of 2 for 50. As a tailend batsman, he scored 21 runs with a highest score of 12 not out. Outside of cricket, he was by profession a clerk in a thread mill. Colledge died at Paisley in October 1985.
