= Jim Robertson (footballer) =

Australian rules footballer

Personal information
- Full name: James Stirton Robertson
- Born: 4 March 1903; Carlton, Victoria
- Died: 4 October 1985 (aged 82); Caulfield South, Victoria
- Original team: Carlton District

Playing career^{1}
Years	Club	Games (Goals)
1924, 1926	Carlton	8 (7)
- ^{1} Playing statistics correct to the end of 1926.

James Stirton Robertson (4 March 1903 – 4 October 1985) was an Australian rules footballer who played with Carlton in the Victorian Football League (VFL).
