= Tree of Freedom =

1949 children's book by Rebecca Caudill

- First edition
- Author: Rebecca Caudill
- Illustrator: Dorothy Morse
- Language: English
- Genre: Children's literature
- Publication date: year
- Publication place: United States

Tree of Freedom is a 1949 children's historical fiction novel written by Rebecca Caudill and illustrated by Dorothy Morse. It is a pioneer story set in Kentucky at the time of the American Revolutionary War. The novel was a Newbery Honor recipient in 1950.

== Plot summary ==
The novel tells the story of the Venable family, Jonathan, Bertha, and their five children, who in 1780 walk from North Carolina to Kentucky to homestead on 400 acres. There, they build a cabin, plant crops, and raise livestock; 13-year-old Stephanie grows an apple tree, which she calls her "tree of freedom". They are dismayed when they discover there is a rival claim to their land made by a British sympathizer. As the war comes closer, Indian raids increase, Jonathan becomes a courier for the Governor of Virginia, and Stephanie's older brother Noel joins an expedition against the Indians with George Rogers Clark.
