= Tassos (engraver) =

Greek engraver

- Born: Anastasios Alevizos; 25 March 1914; Lefkochora of Messenia
- Died: 13 October 1985 (aged 71); Athens
- Known for: Engravings
- Spouse: Loukia Maggiorou

Anastasios Alevizos (25 March 1914 – 13 October 1985) was a Greek engraver, etcher and sculptor, who became famous under the name Tassos for his works on significant milestones of the 20th century history of Greece.

He was born in Lefkochora of Messenia in 1914. He studied in the School of High Arts in Athens at the age of 16, from 1933 til 1938 and attended the engraving classes in Kefallinos’ workshop. He was an apprentice in the workshops of great painters and sculptors such as Demetrios Galanis, Argyros, Parthenis and others. He continued his studies in Rome, Florence and Paris. In 1938 he was awarded the Prize of Engraving and in 1940 the State Medal of Engraving. One of his engravings depicted the 1942 episode where the Greek resistance blew up the Gorgopotamos railway station.

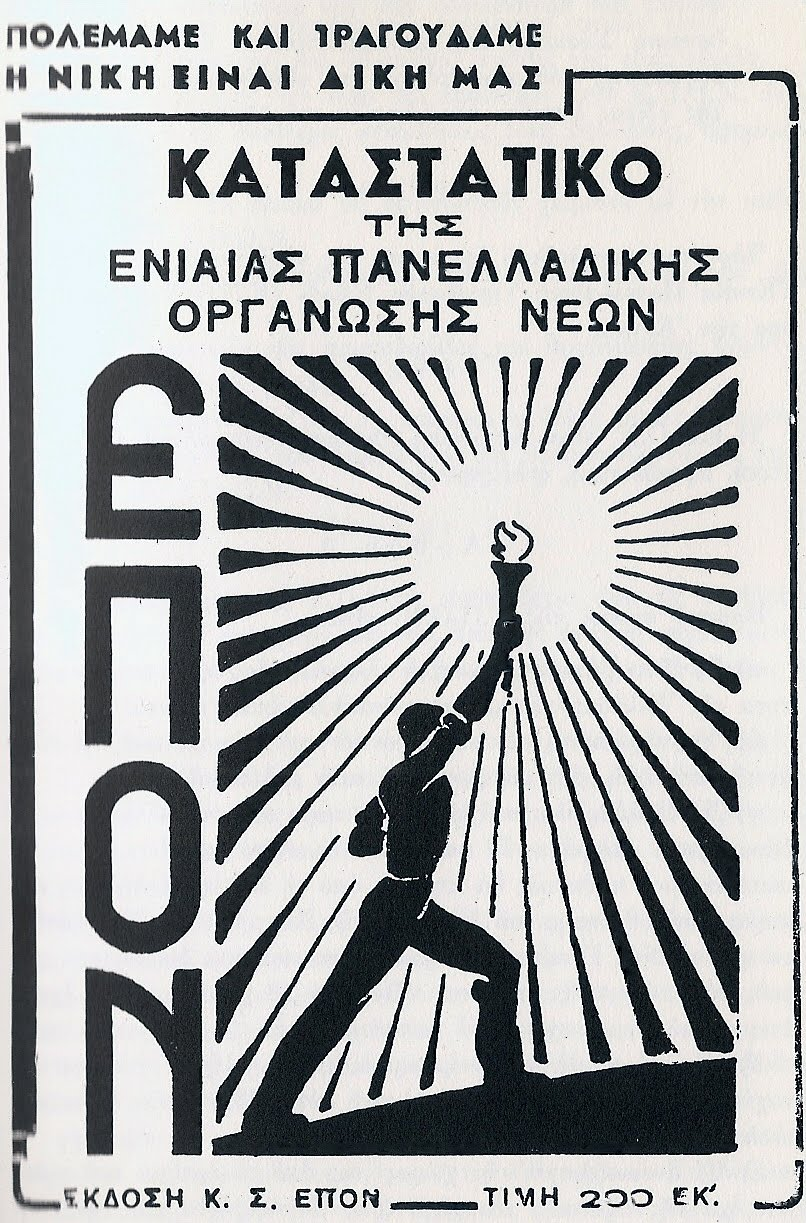
Greek: ΕΠΟΝ propaganda leaflet containing an engraving of Tassos disseminated by Greek partisans during the Axis Occupation (1940–1944).

He was politically affiliated with the communist left party since 1930, and during the Occupation he became member of the United Panhellenic Organization of Youth (Greek: ΕΠΟΝ) and the National Liberation Front (Greek: ΕΑΜ) of artists. During the 7-year dictatorship (1967–1974), Tassos was self-exiled.

He was mostly inspired by the struggles of the nation, the natural beauties of Greece and the everyday life of common people. In 1976 he exhibited his works in the National Gallery. In 1948 he collaborated with the Greek Publishing Organization of Educational Books (Greek: ΟΕΔΒ), and from 1962 until his death in 1985 he had been designing the stamps for the Republic of Cyprus.

He is considered to be one of the most important representatives of Greek engravers and his works were exhibited in USA, Soviet Union, France, Italy and Japan. He also participated in the Venice Biennale exhibition in 1952.
