= James Hutton (rugby union) =

- Born: James Edward Hutton; 8 August 1906 Tianjin, China
- Died: 16 October 1985 (aged 79) London, England

Rugby union career
- Position: Centre
Amateur team(s)
Years	Team	Apps	(Points)
- Westminster Bank
–	Lieutenant Brown's XV		
–	Harlequins		
Provincial / State sides
Years	Team	Apps	(Points)
1928-31	Kent		
1930	Anglo-Scots		
1931	Scotland Probables		
International career
Years	Team	Apps	(Points)
1930-31	Scotland	2	(0)

James Hutton (8 August 1906 – 16 October 1985) was a Scotland international rugby union player.

== Rugby Union career ==
=== Amateur career ===
When playing for Kent county he was noted as playing for Westminster Bank.

He played for a Lieutenant Brown's XV against Halifax.

Hutton played for Harlequins.

=== Provincial career ===
He played for Kent county.

He played for Anglo-Scots against Provinces District on 20 December 1930.

Of the Anglos match, the Aberdeen Press and Journal of 22 December 1930 noted:

J. E. Hutton, after a tentative kind beginning, ended by winning the match for his side, and stamped himself a three-quarter of the highest class. His defence and attack were both excellent.

The Dundee Courier noted in the same date:

Hutton has the artistry, and is admirably built for a Centre. The spotlight showed up very few weaknesses in his case.

That performance propelled Hutton into the final trial match on 10 January 1931 where he played for the Scotland Probables side against the Scotland Possibles.

=== International career ===
He played for Scotland 2 times from 1930 to 1931.

== Banking career ==
Hutton was employed in the Hong Kong and Shanghai bank and played rugby union for their company side; and also captained the United Banks XV.
