= Viktor Gurjev =

Estonian opera singer

Viktor Gurjev (29 August 1914 Riga – 11 October 1985 Tallinn) was an Estonian opera singer (tenor) and pedagogue.

In 1951 he graduated from Tallinn State Conservatory in singing speciality. 1937-1940 he was a member of Vassili Kirillov mandolin ensemble. 1942-1944 he belonged to Estonian SSR State Artistic Ensembles. 1944-1950 he sang with the Estonian National Male Choir. 1949–1968 he was a soloist at Estonia Theatre. From 1956 until 1963, he taught at the Tallinn Music School.

From 1970 until 1982, he was the rector of Tallinn State Conservatory.

== Awards ==
- 1954: Estonian SSR merited artist
- 1960: Estonian SSR people's artist (Estonian: rahvakunstnik)

== Opera roles ==
- duke (Dargomõžski's "Näkineid", 1949)
- Alfredo (Verdi's "Traviata", 1950 and 1962)
- Lenski (Tšaikovski's "Jevgeni Onegin", 1950 and 1966)
