= Rebecca Caudill =

American writer (1899–1985)

- Born: February 2, 1899; Poor Fork, now Cumberland, Kentucky
- Died: October 2, 1985 (aged 86)
- Education: Wesleyan College; Vanderbilt University, M.A. International Relations
- Occupations: Writer, editor, teacher
- Spouse: James Sterling Ayars (1931)
- Writing career
- Language: English
- Period: 1943–?
- Genres: Appalachian fiction, children's literature
- Notable works: Tree of Freedom; A Pocketful of Cricket; Barrie and Daughter; The Far-off Land; Susan Cornish

Rebecca Caudill Ayars (February 2, 1899 – October 2, 1985) was an American writer of children's literature. More than twenty of her books were published. Tree of Freedom (Viking, 1949) was a Newbery Honor Book in 1950. A Pocketful of Cricket (Holt, 1964), illustrated by Evaline Ness, was a Caldecott Honor Book.

== Life ==
Caudill was one of eleven children in the family of Susan and George Caudill of Harlan County, Kentucky. She was born in Poor Fork, now Cumberland, Kentucky. She graduated from Wesleyan College in Macon, Georgia, and then taught English and history 1920–21 at Sumner County High School, Portland, Tennessee. In 1922, she received her master's degree in International Relations from Vanderbilt University. She taught English as a second language (ESL) in Brazil for two years and then returned to Tennessee where she worked briefly as an editor for Abingdon Press, the Methodist Church publishing house in Nashville. She moved to Chicago for a job in a publishing house, and she married James Sterling Ayars in 1931. They moved to Urbana, Illinois in 1937 with their two children.

Caudill's first book, Barrie and Daughter (Viking, 1943), came from memories of her childhood in the hill country of Kentucky and Tennessee. Most of her children's books brought alive the pioneer era of the eighteenth and nineteenth centuries, evoking the culture of Appalachia she loved. She wrote in her memoir: "Doors in the houses of my Appalachia were never locked against friend or stranger. The people found their pleasures in the simple things of life. They possessed a kind of profound wisdom, characteristic of those who live close to Nature, who walk in step with Nature's rhythm, and who depend on Nature for life itself."

== Activism ==
She was the co-founder of the Champaign-Urbana Peace Council; created the hospitality program for international students at Wesleyan College; and served on the boards of trustees for the Pine Mountain Settlement School in Harlan County and the Urbana Free Library in Illinois. She also taught many writing workshops.

== Bibliography ==
Many of these works are translated into at least five other languages besides English.

- Barrie and Daughter (1943)
- Happy Little Family (1947)
- Schoolhouse in the Woods (1949)
- Tree Of Freedom (1949)
- Up and Down the River (1951)
- Florence Nightingale (1953)
- Saturday Cousins (1953)
- The House of the Fifers (1954)
- Susan Cornish (1955)
- Schoolroom in the Parlor (1959)
- Time for Lissa (1959)
- Higgins and the Great Big Scare (1960)
- The Best-loved Doll (1962)
- A Pocketful of Cricket (1964)
- The Far-off Land (1964)
- A Certain Small Shepherd (1965)
- The High Cost of Writing (1965)
- Did You Carry the Flag Today, Charley? (1966)
- My Appalachia: a reminiscence (1966)
- Come Along (1969)
- Contrary Jenkins (1969)
- Rebecca Caudill (1969)
- The World of Rebecca Caudill (1970)
- Somebody Go and Bang a Drum (1974)
- Wind, Sand and Sky (1976)
- From Hardshell Baptist to Quaker (1979)
- The Joyous Land: a play for childhood and youth week (n.d.)

See the Scholastics.com website for a list of Caudill's books by interest level, genre/theme and grade level equivalency.

== Awards and honors ==
In the fall of 1963, the University of Kentucky, Southeast Center honored her with Rebecca Caudill Day. Harlan County's first community library was located in Cumberland, Kentucky, and in 1965 it was named the Rebecca Caudill Public Library in her honor.

=== Kentucky Writers Hall of Fame ===
Rebecca Caudill was inducted into The Kentucky Writers Hall of Fame at an induction ceremony on Thursday, January 23, 2014, at the Carnegie Center in Lexington, Kentucky. Caudill was the Kentucky Hall of Fame's first children's author.

=== Rebecca Caudill Young Reader's Book Award ===
The Rebecca Caudill Young Reader's Book Award (RCYRBA) is named in honor of Caudill and her contributions to children's literature. The schoolchildren in her adopted state of Illinois, Grade 4 to Grade 8, vote each year for their favorite of twenty nominees.
