= Knud Børge Overgaard =

Danish footballer (1918–1985)

Personal information
- Date of birth: 21 March 1918
- Date of death: 20 October 1985 (aged 67)
- Position: Defender

Senior career*
| Years | Team | Apps | (Gls) |
- AGF
- B.93

International career
| 1945–1948 | Denmark | 8 | (0) |
Medal record
Men's Football
Representing Denmark
| Bronze medal – third place | 1948 London | Team |
- * Club domestic league appearances and goals

Knud Børge Overgaard (21 March 1918 – 20 October 1985) was a Danish amateur footballer who played 8 games for the Denmark national football team, and won a bronze medal at the 1948 Summer Olympics. He played his club football with B.93.

Overgaard was an excellent wing half-back with good physicality and tackling ability. He started his career with Aarhus club AGF, but was not selected for the Danish national team, until he moved to Copenhagen club B.93. Overgaard got his international debut for Denmark in 1945, but had to compete with Børge Mathiesen, Ivan Jensen, and Viggo Jensen for the wing half-back spot. Just before the 1948 Summer Olympics, regular Danish defender Knud Bastrup-Birk was injured, and Overgaard was moved out of position to cover as a full-back. In a defensive pairing with Viggo Jensen, the two out-of-position players did better than expected, and Denmark won bronze medals at the tournament. Following the Olympics, Overgaard's international career ended.
