= Florence Jaffy =

American economist

- Born: August 4, 1917; New York
- Died: October 21, 1985 (aged 68); San Francisco, California
- Other name: Florence Conrad
- Occupation: Economist
- Known for: Research director, Daughters of Bilitis

Florence Irene Jaffy (August 4, 1917 – October 21, 1985), also known as Florence Conrad, was an American economist. She taught at the College of San Mateo, and was research director of the Daughters of Bilitis.

== Early life and education ==
Florence Jaffy was born in New York, the daughter of Max Aaron Jaffy and Pauline Reich Jaffy. Her family was Jewish; her father was a civil engineer born in Russia, and her maternal grandparents were from Central Europe. She graduated from Olney High School in Philadelphia in 1935, and graduated from Pennsylvania State College in 1943. She was elected to Phi Beta Kappa while she was in college. She pursued further studies in economics, earning a master's degree at the University of Chicago.

== Career ==
Jaffy worked at the Division of Research and Statistics of the Board of Governors of the Federal Reserve System in the late 1940s. She worked in Paris as an economic analyst with the United States Department of State in the early 1950s. Beginning in 1958, she was a professor of economics at the College of San Mateo. She was awarded tenure in 1961. She was a longtime member of the American Civil Liberties Union.

In 1960s, under the name "Florence Conrad", Jaffy was research director for the Daughters of Bilitis; this work involved working with researchers who wanted to survey the Daughters of Bilitis members, and collecting published research on homosexuality. She also corresponded with activists, and wrote letters of protest to authors and academics who misrepresented lesbian lives. She wrote book reviews for The Ladder. She worked with Barbara Gittings and Barbara Grier on The Ladder, but they did not always agree on the publication's priorities. "I strongly favor 'integration'," she wrote to Gittings, "but this means a sense of some things held in common with the rest of humanity; it does not mean acceptance of society's stigma."

== Publications ==
Jaffy's research appeared in the Quarterly Journal of Economics, and she wrote articles for The Ladder under her pseudonym. She also wrote reports for the Federal Reserve Board's Review of Foreign Developments, often with fellow economist Frank M. Tamagna as co-author.

- "The U.K.-South Africa Financial Agreement" (1947)
- "Geneva Draft of the I.T.O. Charter: Exchange Controls and Quantitative Restrictions" (1947, with Frank M. Tamagna)
- "Foreign Gold and Dollar Resources" (1947, with Frank M. Tamagna)
- "Extension of Sterling Convertibility" (1947)
- "Prospective Drawings on the International Monetary Fund" (1947)
- "U.S. Balance of Payments Prospects for 1948-49" (1948, with Frank M. Tamagna)
- "U.S. Balance of Payments Outlook for 1948" (1948, with Frank M. Tamagna)
- "British Payments Agreements and Sterling Agreements since August 20, 1947" (1948)
- "Clandestine Capital Movements in Balance of Payments Estimates: A Comment" (1951)
- "DOB Questionnaire Reveals Some Facts About Lesbians" (1959, reprinted in 2001)

== Personal life and legacy ==
Jaffy died in 1985, at the age of 68, in San Francisco. Her obituary in the Bay Area Reporter remembered her work to destigmatize homosexuality in the psychiatric field. The GLBT Historical Society holds a small collection of her papers. The College of San Mateo offers a Florence Jaffy Memorial Scholarship, for a student in the social sciences who "has had experience promoting civil liberties and political equality."
