= Francesco Saverio Starrabba Barbera =

Italian politician (1901–1985)

- Born: 26 May 1901; Palermo, Italy
- Died: 8 October 1985 (aged 84); Palermo, Italy
- Years active: 1943-1985
- Title: Marquis of Sant'Agata, Baron of Scibina and Bumisca, of Pachino, Lord of Mandranova

Francesco Saverio Starrabba Barbera (May 26, 1901 – October 8, 1985) was an Italian politician and lawyer.

== Biography ==
He was born in Palermo on May 26, 1901, to Gaetano, VII prince of Giardinelli (1871-1943), and his consort Celeste Barbera, where he was the second of four children. He was a member of the main branch of the noble Starrabba family.

A lawyer and agricultural entrepreneur by profession, in 1943 he was among the people who supported the Movement for the Independence of Sicily. In 1945–46, he was among the 430 consultants of the National Consultation by designation of the National Democratic Liberal Concentration party. Subsequently, with the Liberal Democratic Bloc he was elected deputy to the I legislature of the Sicilian Regional Assembly (1947–51), in the single regional constituency. Having switched to the Italian Liberal Party, he was a candidate for the House in the 1953 general election, and for the Senate in the Palermo II constituency in the 1958 general election, where, however, he failed to be elected.

He lived for many years in Ragusa, where he took care of his own greenhouses, and died in Palermo on October 8, 1985, at the age of 84.
