= Janwillem van den Berg =

- Born: 26 November 1920; Akkrum, The Netherlands
- Died: 18 October 1985 (aged 64); Groningen, The Netherlands

Janwillem van den Berg (26 November 1920 in Akkrum – 18 October 1985 in Groningen) was a Dutch speech scientist and medical physicist who played a major role in establishing the myoelastic-aerodynamic theory of voice production. The most notable aspect of van den Berg's theory is its impact on modern speech science in providing a foundation for modern models of vocal fold function.

Van den Berg designed the first implantable pacemaker that could be switched to a higher beat rate for a higher level of activity. The first experiments for an R-top triggered pacemaker were done, and the design of electrodes to the heart was tested in animal experiments. This made Van den Berg known to the cardiologists of that time.

== Literature ==
- Van den Berg, J. (1958). Myoelastic-aerodynamic Theory of Voice production, Journal of Speech and Hearing Research 3(1): 227–244.
- Titze, I. R. (2006). The Myoelastic Aerodynamic Theory of Phonation, Iowa City: National Center for Voice and Speech, 2006.
