= Roy Atkins =

Australian rules footballer, born 1908

Personal information
- Full name: Roy Atkins
- Born: 27 July 1908
- Died: 6 October 1985 (aged 77)
- Original team: Korumburra
- Height: 185 cm (6 ft 1 in)
- Weight: 84 kg (185 lb)

Playing career^{1}
Years	Club	Games (Goals)
1930	North Melbourne	14 (4)
- ^{1} Playing statistics correct to the end of 1930.

Roy Atkins (27 July 1908 – 6 October 1985) was an Australian rules footballer who played with North Melbourne in the Victorian Football League (VFL).
