= J. Grant Anderson =

Scottish actor

James Grant Anderson (20 April 1897 – 1 October 1985) was a Scottish actor, writer, and theatre director, usually credited as J. Grant Anderson or Grant Anderson. He served in both World War I and World War II. He founded the Indian National Theatre in 1932.

== Biography ==
Anderson was born in Glenlivet, Banffshire, Scotland, on 20 April 1897, to James Anderson and Helen Christina Grant. His father was a vet who later practised in Mortlake. Anderson was trained for the stage at the Richmond Theatre and the Surrey Theatre. In World War I, Anderson served with the London Scottish Regiment starting in 1915. He was wounded in 1917 and discharged the following year. Anderson served with the London Scottish Regiment again in 1939 at the outbreak of World War II. He later served on the Entertainments National Service Association.'

He died 1 October 1985 at Denville Hall, the retirement home for performers.

== Theatrical career ==
Anderson made his first stage appearance in June 1914 in a production of When Knights Were Bold at the Apollo Theatre. In the summer of 1915, Anderson appeared in a series of plays at the New Theatre Oxford with Sir John Martin-Harvey. In 1923, Anderson started his own repertory company in Gosport. From 1929 through 1939, Anderson toured with his company through India, Burma, Ceylon, China, Japan, Kashmir, Afghanistan, Java, and Sumatra. In 1932, he founded the Indian National Theatre in Bombay, in which English and Indian classics would be presented by all-Indian casts. While in Burma and what was then known as Siam, Anderson appeared as a clown in Hagenbeck's Circus. After serving in World War II, Anderson served as resident director at the Intimate Theatre from 1947 through 1950.

Anderson wrote the play The Wisest Fool in 1946. He also wrote an autobiography titled Diamond Jubilee Hangover.
