= Fritz Zwicky (composer) =

Fritz Zwicky (10 September 1893, Steg at Mitlödi – 28 October 1985, Vevey) was a Swiss composer, arranger, and clarinetist. He trained as a musician in Glarus and played in the band in that city before moving to Richterswil in 1910 where he performed in ensembles under conductor Max Ringeisen. He also played with a dance orchestra in Stäfa. In 1912 he became a clarinetist in the orchestra of the Stadttheater Neuburg. He also played clarinet in several military bands within the Swiss Army. He was a well known composer and arranger for band; particularly of marches.

== Marches by Zwicky ==
- Excelsior Marsch
- St. Fridolinsmarsch
- Sie und Er Marsch
- Simplex Marsch
- Splendo Marsch
- Tip Top Marsch
- Treue Kameraden Marsch
- Unseren Veteranen Marsch
