= Amalia Celia Figueredo =

Argentine aviator

- Born: February 18, 1895
- Died: October 8, 1985 (aged 90)
- Occupation: Aviator
- Known for: First woman in Argentina to obtain a pilot's license
- Spouse: Alexander Carlos Pietra

Amalia Celia Figueredo (also known as Amalia Celia Figueredo de Pietra), (18 February 1895 – 8 October 1985) was an Argentine aviator. She was the first woman in Argentina, and possibly in Latin America, to obtain a pilot's license.

== Biography ==
Figueredo made her first flight at Villa Lugano aerodrome in Buenos Aires, Argentina, in 1914, with the Frenchman Paul Castaibert. Castaibert was an aircraft builder as well as an aviator, and taught Figueredo to fly in one of his 25-horsepower Castaibert-Anzani monoplanes. However, as the monoplane had only a single cockpit, Figueredo had to be instructed on land. She subsequently moved to Marcel Paillete's flying school in San Fernando, where she flew in 50-horsepower Farman-Gnome biplanes with an instructor in the air with her. Figueredo attempted her pilot license test in September that year, but suffered an accident and re-took the test in October, passing with distinction.

Figueredo became skilled in aerobatics, and performed at the old National Race course, the Sportiva Argentina in Palermo and the airfield at Villa Lugano. In June 1915, she organised a flight from Buenos Aires to her hometown of Rosario, where she carried out several demonstration flights in a Farman aircraft.

Figueredo retired from aviation soon after, when she married Alexander Carlos Pietra.

== Recognition ==
On October 1, 1964, the fiftieth anniversary of her obtaining her license, the Ministry of Aeronautics awarded Figueredo the honorary designation of Military pilot. In September 1968 her achievements were recognised by Uruguay, and in November 1968 Brazil decorated her with the rank of Grand Officer of the Order of Merit. On January 21, 1970, she was given the title of Precursora de la Aeronáutica Argentina. In September 1971 she was recognised as a pioneer aviator by France.
