= Richard E. Ferrario =

American politician (1931–1985)

Richard E. Ferrario (July 24, 1931 – October 13, 1985) was an American politician.

Ferrario was born in Duluth, Minnesota and graduated from Denfeld High School in Duluth. He served in the United States Air Force during the Korean War. Ferrario graduated from the University of Minnesota Duluth. He lived in Duluth with his wife and family and was a school teacher. Ferrario served in the Minnesota Senate from 1959 to 1964 and was a Democrat. He died at his home in Duluth, Minnesota.
