= Doug Johnstone (footballer) =

Australian rules footballer, born 1903

Personal information
- Full name: Douglas Johnstone
- Born: 5 August 1903; Footscray, Victoria
- Died: 25 October 1985 (aged 82); Sunbury, Victoria

Playing career^{1}
Years	Club	Games (Goals)
1926–28	Footscray	37 (0)
- ^{1} Playing statistics correct to the end of 1928.

Doug Johnstone (5 August 1903 – 25 October 1985) was an Australian rules footballer who played with Footscray in the Victorian Football League (VFL).
