= Liu Woying =

Chinese politician

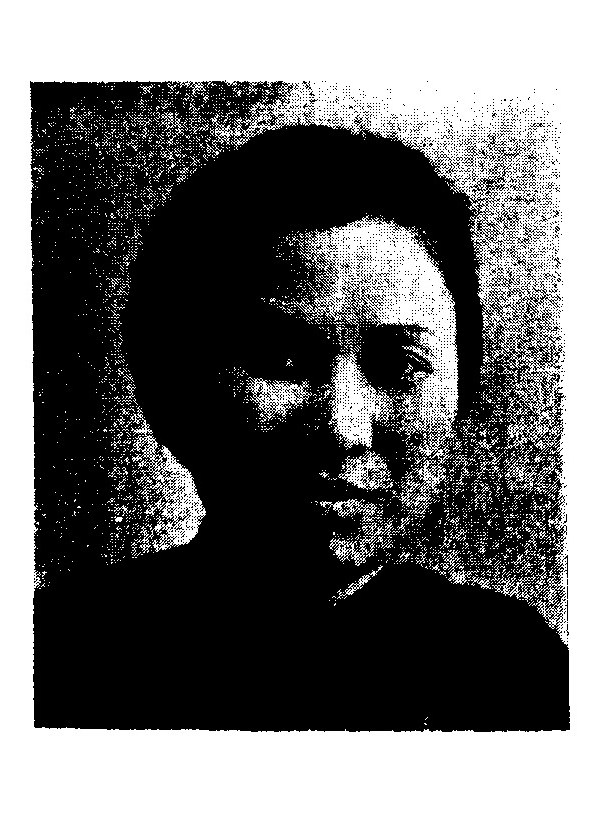

Member of the Legislative Yuan
- In office 1948–1985
- Constituency: Fujian

Personal details
- Born: 1906
- Died: 26 October 1985 (aged 78–79)

Liu Woying (Chinese: 劉我英, 1906 – 26 October 1985) was a Chinese politician. She was among the first group of women elected to the Legislative Yuan in 1948.

== Biography ==
Liu was born in 1906. Originally from Shaowu in Fujian province, she attended Hwa Nan College and later earned a Bachelor of Laws at Peking University. She subsequently became a researcher in the graduate school of American University, focussing on international relations. Returning to China, she became director of the Banqiao Rural Welfare Experimental Zone in Jiangning County, a joint project with the Agricultural College of University of Nanking and the Ministry of Agriculture and Forestry. During the Second Sino-Japanese War she served as director of the Chongqing Wartime Childcare Association.

Liu was a Kuomintang candidate in Fujian in the 1948 elections for the Legislative Yuan, and was elected to parliament. She relocated to Taiwan during the Chinese Civil War, where she became a professor and dean of discipline at National Taiwan University and Soochow University. She also served as head of Huaxing Middle School and chair of Methodist Girls' Senior High School. She remained a member of the Legislative Yuan until her death in 1985.
