= Cyril Edge =

English cricketer

Personal information
- Full name: Cyril Arthur Edge
- Born: 14 October 1916; Ashton-under-Lyne, Lancashire, England
- Died: 5 October 1985 (aged 68); Ormskirk, Lancashire, England
- Batting: Right-handed
- Bowling: Right-arm fast-medium

Domestic team information
- Years: Team
- 1936–1938: Lancashire
- 1939: Minor Counties

Career statistics
Competition	First-class
Matches	9
Runs scored	17
Batting average	5.66
100s/50s	–/–
Top score	15*
Balls bowled	1,604
Wickets	29
Bowling average	30.10
5 wickets in innings	–
10 wickets in match	–
Best bowling	4/71
Catches/stumpings	2/–
- Source: Cricinfo, 5 May 2012

Cyril Arthur Edge (14 December 1916 – 5 October 1985) was an English cricketer. Edge was a right-handed batsman who bowled right-arm fast-medium. He was born at Ashton-under-Lyne, Lancashire.

Edge made his first-class debut for Lancashire against Worcestershire at Old Trafford in the 1936 County Championship. He made seven further first-class appearances for the county, the last of which came against Essex in the 1938 County Championship. In his eight first-class appearances for Lancashire, he took 25 wickets at an average of 30.36, with best figures of 4/71. A poor batsman, he scored just 2 runs from five innings, averaging 0.66. He also represented the Lancashire Second XI in the Minor Counties Championship, which allowed him to represent a combined Minor Counties team against the touring West Indians at Lord's in 1939. Batting first, the West Indians made 370 all out, with Edge taking figures of 4/97 from sixteen overs. The Minor Counties responded in their first-innings by making 310 all out, with Edge himself ending the innings not out on 15, his highest score in first-class cricket. In their second-innings, the West Indians were reached 138/4, with edge bowling five wicketless overs. The match ended as a draw.

He died at Ormskirk, Lancashire, on 5 October 1985.
