= Don Quartermain =

Australian rules footballer, born 1908

Personal information
- Full name: Donald Charles Quartermain
- Born: 2 July 1908; Trafalgar, Victoria
- Died: 23 October 1985 (aged 77); Richmond, Victoria
- Original team: Kew
- Height: 178 cm (5 ft 10 in)
- Weight: 80 kg (176 lb)

Playing career^{1}
Years	Club	Games (Goals)
1935–36	Fitzroy	4 (0)
- ^{1} Playing statistics correct to the end of 1936.

Donald Charles Quartermain (2 July 1908 – 23 October 1985) was an Australian rules footballer who played with Fitzroy in the Victorian Football League (VFL).

== Biography ==
He was the older brother of Hawthorn player Allan Quartermain and his grandson, Joel Quartermain, is the guitarist in the band Eskimo Joe.

Quartermain later served in the Australian Army during World War II.
