= George Gooma =

Australian cricketer

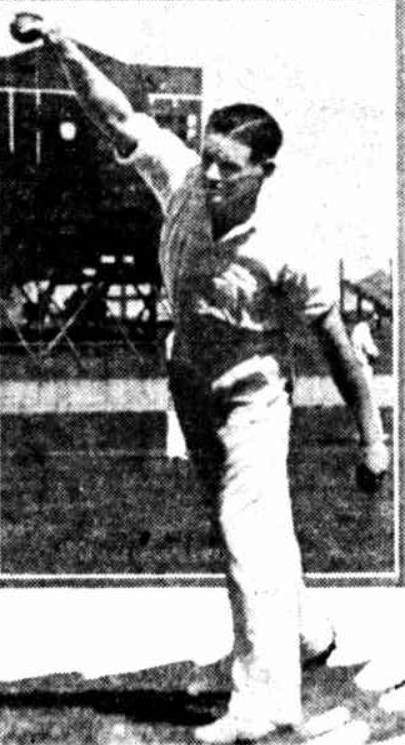

Personal information
- Born: 25 June 1918; Fortitude Valley, Queensland, Australia
- Died: 1 October 1985 (aged 67); Brisbane, Queensland, Australia
- Source: Cricinfo, 3 October 2020

George Gooma (25 June 1918 – 1 October 1985) was an Australian cricketer. He played in two first-class matches for Queensland in 1939/40.

== See also ==
- List of Queensland first-class cricketers
