= Ottar Gravås =

Norwegian politician

- Born: 2 August 1922; Leksvik Municipality, Norway
- Died: 17 October 1985 (aged 63)
- Occupation: Politician

Ottar Gravås (2 August 1922 – 17 October 1985) was a Norwegian politician.

He was born in Leksvik Municipality to farmer Julius Gravås and Anette Bjørseth. He was elected representative to the Storting for the period 1973–1977 for the Christian Democratic Party.
