= Alice C. Browning =

American writer, editor, publisher, and educator

Alice Crolley Browning (November 5, 1907 – October 15, 1985) was an American writer, editor, publisher, and educator. Alongside Fern Gayden, she co-edited Negro Story (1944-6), an important literary journal in the Black Chicago Renaissance. She was the founder and director of the International Black Writers Conference in Chicago.

== Early life ==
Alice Crolley was born in Chicago, Illinois, the daughter of Richard A. Crolley and Liattah Marshall Crolley. Her father was from Atlanta, Georgia; her mother was from New Orleans, Louisiana. She graduated from the University of Chicago in 1931. She later earned a master's degree in English literature at Columbia University, where she worked with Vernon Loggins on a thesis about African-American fiction in the nineteenth century.

== Career ==
Alice Crolley Franklin worked briefly as a social worker, but for more than forty years (1930-1973), she taught at Forrestville Elementary School in Chicago, while pursuing literary interests.

From 1944 to 1946, Browning published a literary magazine, Negro Story, co-edited with her friend Fern Gayden. It featured works by authors Gwendolyn Brooks, Langston Hughes, Richard Wright, Ralph Ellison, and Chester Himes, and by illustrator Elton Fax, among others. She also included her own stories, often under a pseudonym, "Lila Marshall" or "Richard Bentley." A related project, the Negro Story Press, published a children's magazine, Child's Play, and a book documenting the contemporary jazz scene called Lionel Hampton's Swing Book. The collection was published with Lionel Hampton. The Browning Letter (1953-1956) and Zip (1963) were later efforts at periodical publication.

In 1970, she founded the International Black Writers Conference. She directed the annual event in Chicago until 1984.

== Personal life ==
Alice Crolley married twice, first at age 16 to George Franklin, and second in 1936 to Charles Patrick Browning. She had one daughter, Barbara Franklin Cordell. Alice was widowed in 1954 when Charles Browning died. She died in 1985, aged 77 years.

Browning's papers are archived in the Chicago Public Library's Carter G. Woodson Regional Library.
