= Jack Highton =

Royal Navy admiral (1904-1988)

Rear-Admiral Jack Highton CB CBE
- Rear-Admiral J.K. Highton CB CBE
- Born: Jack Kenneth Highton; 2 September 1904
- Died: 17 February 1988 (aged 83)
- Spouse: Eileen Flack (m. 1933)
- Military career
- Allegiance: United Kingdom
- Branch: Royal Navy
- Service years: 1922-65
- Rank: Rear-Admiral
- Awards: CB CBE

Rear-Admiral Jack Kenneth Highton CB CBE (2 September 1904 – 17 February 1988) was Chief Staff Officer to Commander-in-Chief, Plymouth (1957–60), and Aide-de-Camp to Queen Elizabeth II.

== Naval career ==
Jack Kenneth Highton was the son of John Hay Highton and was born on 2 September 1904. Following his education at Bedford Modern School he entered the Royal Navy in 1922 and was appointed to the training battleship HMS Thunderer. From 1935-37 he was Secretary to the Commodore, New Zealand Squadron and from 1938 to 1940 he was Secretary to the Flag Officer (Submarines).

From 1943 to 52 he was Secretary to Sir Arthur J Power, Admiral of the Fleet, and in 1957 he was appointed Chief Staff Officer to the Commander in Chief (Plymouth). He was promoted to Rear-Admiral in the same year and served as ADC to H.M. The Queen. He was appointed OBE in 1946, CBE in 1952 and CB in 1959.

He married Eileen Flack in 1933 and they settled in Woodbridge, Suffolk where Highton died on 17 February 1988.
