= Rosalie Van der Gucht =

English theatre director (1908–1985)

- Born: Rosalie Else Van der Gucht; 27 October 1908; British Burma
- Died: 31 October 1985 (aged 77); Cape Town, South Africa
- Education: Tudor Hall, Chislehurst; Lycée Victor Duruy, Paris; University of London (Diploma in Dramatic Art)
- Occupations: Theatre director, educator
- Years active: 1927–1971
- Employer: University of Cape Town
- Known for: Head of Speech and Drama Department, University of Cape Town; contribution to South African theatre
- Awards: Three Leaf Award; AA Mutual Life Award for Services to Drama; AA Vita Award

Rosalie Van der Gucht (27 October 1908 – 31 October 1985) was an English theatre director and head of the speech and drama department at the University of Cape Town, recalled as "one of the great figures in the history of South African theatre" by a newspaper critic.

== Early life ==
Rosalie Else Van der Gucht was born in British Burma. Her mother Florence Roberts, who was born in Tasmania, worked as a governess to the princesses of Siam before marrying; her English-born father Claude Van der Gucht worked for the Bombay-Burma Trading Company. When she was four years old, Rosalie van der Gucht was sent to live with relatives in England. She attended Tudor Hall in Chislehurst and Lycee Victor Duruy in Paris, where she earned a diploma in French culture. She studied with Elsie Fogerty and later earned a diploma in Dramatic Art at the University of London.

== Career ==
While still in England, Van der Gucht taught speech and drama at the Malvern Girls' College from 1927 to 1933. She served on a London council for instructors of speech and drama, the British Drama League's Panel of Adjudicators, and taught at the Stanhope Women's Evening Institute and Croftdown school. She directed and acted in amateur plays as a member of the Questors Theatre Club.

In 1939, during World War II, Van der Gucht left England for South Africa, to work at the Grahamstown Training College. In 1942, she was hired to join the faculty at the University of Cape Town; she acted and taught there until her retirement in 1971. She became head of the speech and drama department in 1946. In 1956 she organized the Cape Town's Theatre for Youth.

After retiring from her academic position, she traveled and directed plays. She was recognized with a Three Leaf Award for her directing, with the AA Mutual Life award for services to drama, and with an AA Vita award for her educational contributions. Today there is a Rosalie van der Gucht Prize for New Directors, named in her memory.

== Personal life ==
A former student recalled Van der Gucht as "eccentric and never wrong... a punk rocker before her time, combination bully and virgin, experimental Merlin and exploitative mentor." Rosalie Van der Gucht died in 1985, in Cape Town. Her papers are in the Human Sciences Research Council and the University of Cape Town Archives.
