= Jimmy Frew (footballer, born 1895) =

Scottish footballer

Personal information
- Full name: James Frew
- Date of birth: 4 June 1895
- Place of birth: Ballochmyle, Scotland
- Date of death: 26 October 1985 (aged 90)
- Place of death: Catrine, Scotland
- Position: Defender

Senior career*
Years	Team	Apps	(Gls)
1918–1919	Lugar Boswell		
1919–1920	Lanemark		
1920	Hurlford		
1920	Nithsdale Wanderers		
1920	Kilmarnock	19	(1)
1921	→ Nithsdale Wanderers (loan)		
1922–1926	Chelsea	42	(0)
1927–1929	Southend United	56	(0)
1929–1930	Carlisle United	24	(2)
Total		141	(3)
- * Club domestic league appearances and goals

James Frew (4 June 1895 – 25 October 1985) was a Scottish footballer who played in the Football League for Carlisle United, Chelsea and Southend United.
