= William Rudolph Kanne =

American physicist (1913–1985)

William Rudolph Kanne (7 July 1913 – 24 October 1985), was a physicist, inventor and pioneer in the field of gas flow through ionization detectors, a member of the group responsible for the first self-sustained nuclear chain fission reaction at Staggs Field in Chicago, and participated in the Manhattan Project at the Chicago, Oak Ridge and Hanford sites.

== Biography ==
In 1913, Kanne was born in Baltimore, Maryland to William G. and Adele Bianka Kanne née Thienemann. His father was born in Germany and his mother was born in Maryland.

In 1937, he married Elizabeth Mueller. The couple moved to Madison, Wisconsin to accept positions at the University of Wisconsin. According to the 1940 U.S. Census, Kanne worked as a physics instructor for a state university and his wife Elizabeth worked as a substitute teacher at a graduate school in Madison, Wisconsin. In 1931, Elizabeth "Lib" Mueller graduated at the top of her class from Goucher College in Towson, Maryland and then attended Stanford University where she earned a master's degree in bacteriology.

Kanne died at home of intestinal cancer in 1985 at Los Gatos, California. Kanne was buried at Loudon Park Cemetery in Baltimore, Maryland.

== Education ==
In 1937, Kanne earned a Ph.D. in physics from Johns Hopkins University.

== Career ==
With Ph.D. in hand, Kanne landed a position as a physics instructor at the University of Wisconsin. From 1940 to 1944, he served at the Illinois Institute of Technology as assistant professor in physics. In 1942, Kanne secured a position with the Metallurgical Laboratory at the University of Chicago. He became part of the select group that built and operated the Chicago Pile 1 with Enrico Fermi and Leo Szilard, and on 2 December 1942 achieved the first sustained nuclear chain reaction. From Chicago Kanne went to Oak Ridge, Tennessee to work at the Clinton Laboratory. Next he was transferred to work for DuPont at the Hanford Works in the state of Washington.

In 1946, Kanne was offered a staff position with the General Electric Research Laboratory in Schenectady, New York. Next he was transferred to the Knolls Atomic Power Laboratory in Niskayuna, New York. General Electric had established the facility for the design and development of the U.S. Navy's naval reactor program. Kanne was appointed as supervisor in the experimental nuclear physics section. He became manager of the project physics and advanced development group.

In 1958, Kanne moved to San Jose, California to work at GE's Atomic Power Equipment Department as manager and then the engineering physics, core and fuel engineering department. He returned to Schenectady to become the group liaison scientist at the GE Research and Development Center. In 1973, Kanne retired from General Electric.

== Professional Service ==
- American Nuclear Society, board of directors, fellow
- American Physical Society, member

== Patents ==
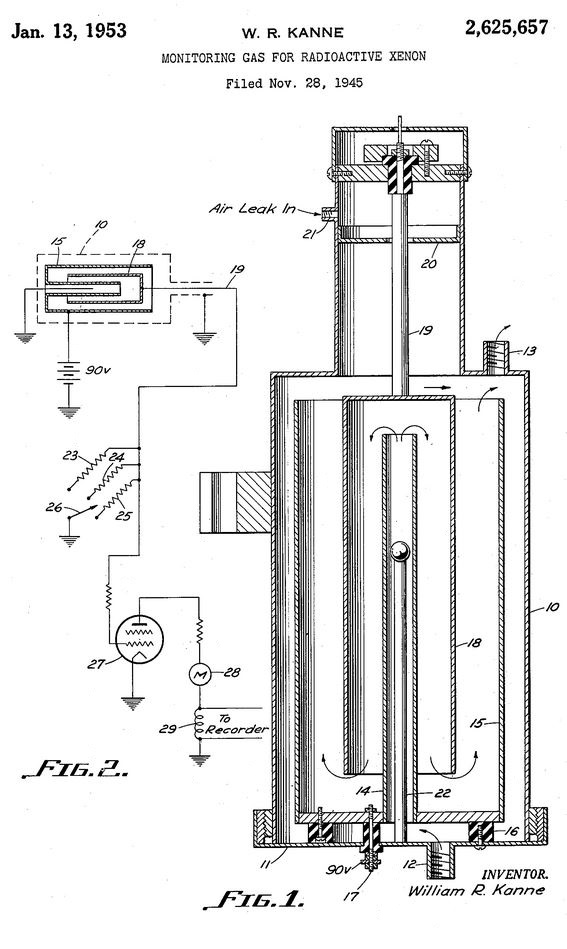
Kanne Chamber

Kanne was an inventor and the Kanne chamber, patented in 1952, may be his most notable invention.

- Detecting Device. W.R. Kanne. U.S. Patent 2,513,805 (1943). Patent filed date.
- Kanne, W. Rudolph. (4 July 1950). Detecting device. U.S. Patent No. 2,513,805. Washington, DC: U.S. Patent and Trademark Office.
- Kanne Chamber patent. Kanne, W. Rudolph. (10 June 1952). Monitoring of gas for radioactivity. U.S. Patent No. 2,599,922. Washington, DC: U.S. Patent and Trademark Office.
- Kanne, W. Rudolph. (13 January 1953). Monitoring gas for radioactive xenon. U.S. Patent No. 2,625,657. Washington, DC: U.S. Patent and Trademark Office.
- Kanne, W. Rudolph. (14 October 1958). Nuclear reactor slug provided with thermocouple. U.S. Patent No. 2,856,341. Washington, DC: U.S. Patent and Trademark Office.
- Kanne, W. Rudolph. (24 November 1959). Thermal couple for measuring temperature in a reactor. U.S. Patent No. 2,914,594. Washington, DC: U.S. Patent and Trademark Office.

== Selected publications ==
- Dissertation: Kanne, William Rudolph. (1937). Disintegration of Aluminum by Polonium Alpha-Particles. Physical Review. 52(4): 266.
- Kanne, W. Rudolph. (15 August 1937). On the Preparation of Polonium Sources. Physical Review. (52): 380.
- Kanne, W.R., R.F. Taschek, and G.L. Ragan. (1940). A Search for Resonance Scattered Protons from ^{11}B and ^{19}F. Physical Review. (58): 693.
- Ragan, G.L., W.R. Kanne, and R.F. Taschek. (1941). The Scattering of Protons by Protons from 200 to 300 KeV. Physical Review. (60): 628.
- Wilkening, M.H. and W.R. Kanne. (1942). Localization of the Discharge in G-M Counters. Physical Review. (62): 534.
- Kanne, W. R. (1955). Introduction to Nuclear Engineering. Journal of the American Chemical Society. 77(5): 1394.
- Kanne, W. R. (1961). Basic Principles of Nuclear Science and Reactors. Journal of the American Chemical Society. 83(2): 508.
- Kanne, W. R. (1968). Creep Behavior in Stoichiometric NiAl. University of Wisconsin—Madison.

== Citations ==
- Fitzgerald, J. J., & Borelli, B. W. (1954). Determination of Efficiency of Kanne Chamber for Detection of Radiogases (No. KAPL-1231). Knolls Atomic Power Lab.
- Hoy, J. E. (1961). Operational experience with Kanne ionization chambers. Health Physics. 6(2): 203-210.
