= Edward Highton =

English cricketer

Personal information
- Full name: Edward Frederick William Highton
- Born: 29 August 1924; Formby, Lancashire, England
- Died: 9 October 1985 (aged 61); Formby, Lancashire, England
- Batting: Right-handed
- Bowling: Right-arm fast-medium

Domestic team information
- Years: Team
- 1951: Lancashire
- 1950: Minor Counties

Career statistics
Competition	First-class
Matches	2
Runs scored	34
Batting average	11.33
100s/50s	–/–
Top score	26
Balls bowled	288
Wickets	7
Bowling average	23.14
5 wickets in innings	–
10 wickets in match	–
Best bowling	4/87
Catches/stumpings	1/–
- Source: Cricinfo, 11 August 2012

Edward Frederick William Highton (29 August 1924 – 9 October 1985) was an English cricketer. Highton was a right-handed batsman who bowled right-arm fast-medium. He was born at Formby, Lancashire.

Highton made his debut for the Lancashire Second XI against the Warwickshire Second XI in the 1949 Minor Counties Championship. He made 27 further appearances for the Lancashire Second XI in the Minor Counties Championship, the last of which came against Cheshire in 1952. Playing minor counties cricket for the Lancashire Second XI allowed him to be selected for a combined Minor Counties cricket team in 1950, making his first-class debut for the team against the Marylebone Cricket Club at Lord's in 1950. Batting first, the Marylebone Cricket Club were dismissed for 127, with Highton taking the wickets of Maurice Crouch and Adam Powell to finish with figures of 2/26 from thirteen overs. The Minor Counties were then dismissed for 172, with Highton scoring 2 runs before he was dismissed by Fred Titmus. Responding in their second-innings, the Marylebone Cricket Club made 229 all out, with Highton taking figures of 4/87 from 25 overs. Chasing 185 for victory, the Minor Counties were dismissed for 129, with Highton last man out when he was dismissed by Francis Appleyard. The following season, he made his only first-class appearance for Lancashire against Essex at Castle Park Cricket Ground, Colchester, in the County Championship. Essex won the toss and elected to bat first, making 384/8 declared in their first-innings, with Highton taking a single wicket, that of Sonny Avery to finish with figures of 1/49 from ten overs. Lancashire were then dismissed for 286 in their second-innings, with Highton scoring 6 runs before he was dismissed by Bill Greensmith. Essex then reached 40/2 declared in their second-innings, at which point the match was declared a draw.

He died at Formby on 9 October 1985.
