= Albert Downs =

Australian rules footballer, born 1905

Personal information
- Full name: Albert Downs
- Born: 26 September 1905
- Died: 7 October 1985 (aged 80)
- Original team: Collingwood Juniors
- Height: 164 cm (5 ft 5 in)
- Weight: 68 kg (150 lb)

Playing career^{1}
Years	Club	Games (Goals)
1933	Collingwood	1 (0)
- ^{1} Playing statistics correct to the end of 1933.

Albert Downs (26 September 1905 – 7 October 1985) was an Australian rules footballer who played for the Collingwood Football Club in the Victorian Football League (VFL).
