= Kaare Langlo =

Norwegian meteorologist (1913–1985)

- Born: October 7, 1913; Bergen
- Died: October 7, 1985 (aged 72); Oslo
- Education: University of Oslo
- Occupation: Meteorologist
- Awards: Knight First Class of the Order of St. Olav (1975)
- Position held: director (1978–1983), deputy secretary general (1971–1975)

Kaare Langlo (7 October 1913 in Bergen, Norway – 7 October 1985 in Oslo) was a Norwegian meteorologist. He contributed to establishing meteorology as an important scientific field both in Norway and internationally. Langlo was assistant general secretary of the World Meteorological Organization (WMO).

== Biography ==
Langlo grew up in Bergen and received his examen artium (baccalaureate) at Sydneshaugens skole in 1932. He earned a Cand.Real. degree in 1941 and his Ph.D. in 1953 both from the University of Oslo. From 1940 to 1943 he was at the Auroral Observatory in Tromsø. In 1944 he was at the Christian Michelsens Institutt in Bergen and in 1945 at Meteorological Office in London. Langlo was a meteorologist at the Meteorological Institute in Oslo 1943–1945 and department head 1945–1952.

Langlo held leading positions at the secretariat of the World Meteorological Organization (WMO) from 1952 to 1975. He played an important role in establishing international programs such as World Weather Watch and Global Atmospheric Research Programme. From 1970 he was assistant general secretary. From 1976 he was senior advisor to the Norwegian Meteorological Institute and from 1978 to 1983 Langlo was director of the institute.

During his time at the institute he was promoting internationalization and he was eagerly working for Norwegian membership of the European Centre for Medium-Range Weather Forecasts in Reading in Great Britain. Norway eventually became a member, but that was after he had retired from the director chair.

== Notority ==
He published several geophysical reports and articles and is most well known for establishing links between the ozone layer and meteorological conditions. In particular, as early as 1952 he associated low ozone levels in the stratosphere to the presence of polar stratospheric clouds (PSCs).

Kaare Langlo was named Knight, First Class of Order of St. Olav in 1975 for his contribution to international meteorological collaboration.

From 1960 to 1970 he was member of the International Ozone Commission.

== Some publications ==
- Lokale Änderungen der Struktur der Ionosphäre auf hohen Breitegraden, Geofysiske publikasjoner, vol. 13 no. 6, 1942
- Investigations on atmospheric ozone at Nordlysobservatoriet, Tromsø (co-author: E. Tønsberg), Geofysiske publikasjoner, vol. 13 no. 12, 1944
- Investigations on the Air Temperature observed in Various Types of Norwegian Thermometer Screens, Meteorologiske annaler, vol. 2 no. 12, 1947
- The Effects of the Solar Eclipse of July 1945 on the Air Temperature and an Examination of the Lag of a Thermometer exposed in a Screen, Meteorologiske annaler, vol. 3 no. 3, 1949
- On the Amount of Atmospheric Ozone and its Relation to Meteorological Conditions, doctoral thesis, Geofysiske publikasjoner, vol. 18 no. 6, 1952

== Sources ==
- Kaare Larsen. (2012-02-19) I Store norske leksikon. From http://snl.no/.nbl_biografi/Kaare_Langlo/utdypning
