= Joe Flanagan (footballer) =

Australian rules footballer

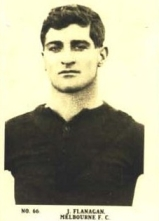

Personal information
- Full name: Joseph Flanagan
- Born: 3 April 1898; Kilmore, Victoria
- Died: 7 October 1985 (aged 87); Fitzroy, Victoria
- Original team: Ballarat

Playing career^{1}
Years	Club	Games (Goals)
1921–24	Melbourne	36 (1)
- ^{1} Playing statistics correct to the end of 1924.

Joe Flanagan (3 April 1898 – 7 October 1985) was an Australian rules footballer who played with Melbourne in the Victorian Football League (VFL).
