= Elizabeth Tan =

Elizabeth Tan may refer to:

- Elizabeth Tan (English actress), British actress
- Elizabeth Tan (singer) (born 1993), Malaysian singer, model and actress
- Elizabeth Tan (author) (born 1988), Australian writer
- Elizabeth-Ann Tan, Singaporean athlete
