= Asphyxia (author) =

Australian writer

- Born: Melbourne, Victoria, Australia
- Occupations: Author, public speaker, artist
- Children: 1
- Writing career
- Period: 2012–present
- Genres: Children's fiction; young adult fiction
- Notable works: Future Girl; The Words in My Hands; The Grimstones
- Website: asphyxia.com.au

Asphyxia is a Deaf Australian artist, writer, and former puppeteer and circus performer. She is the author of Future Girl (titled The Words in My Hands in North America), which won the Readings Young Adult Book Prize in 2021 and was shortlisted for several others.

== Early life and education ==
Asphyxia was born in Melbourne, the second eldest of eight children, being nicknamed Asphyxia by one of her brothers when she was a teenager. She attended a hearing school and did not learn Auslan until she was 18, as her parents were not satisfied with the standard of the education for the deaf.

When she was 12, she entered her first book into the St Kilda Writers Festival, where it won first place.

As a child, she had dreams of being a ballet dancer, but the Australian Ballet School turned her down because of her deafness.

== Career ==
=== Circus and puppetry ===
After leaving school, Asphyxia turned to circus, training with Circus Oz, specialising in trapeze and hula hoops. She incorporated her deafness into her work; one of the ways she did this was by signing karaoke, which was a success with her audiences.

After being a circus performer for ten years, Asphyxia discovered puppetry through Sergio Barrio, a master puppeteer, whom she met when touring with her show and begged to teach her his craft. She then learned how to make her own puppets and sets. After some experimentation, she ended up with a gothic family of puppets which she named the Grimstones. She then left the circus to travel around Australia performing with her puppets.

=== Writing ===
After a few years of touring, Asphyxia got a call from publishing company Allen & Unwin, who told her that they thought that the Grimstones would make for a good book. In February 2012 she published the first of four books in the series, Hatched. The next three in the series, Mortimer Revealed (April 2012), Whirlwind (December 2012), and Music School (December 2013) soon followed.

Future Girl, published in August 2020, won the 2021 Readings Prize for Young Adult Fiction. The book was selected by The Guardian as one of the top 20 Australian books of 2020, by Kirkus Reviews as one of the best young adult fiction titles of 2021, and by the Children's Book Council of Australia as a notable book of 2021. Future Girl was shortlisted for several awards, including the Indie Book Awards (2021), the Australian Book Industry Awards (2021), and the Aurealis Awards (2020). Orange Entertainment optioned the book for a TV adaptation.

== Personal life ==
For 20 years, Asphyxia lived in a small cottage in inner-city Melbourne, which she built herself when she was 22. As of 2026 she lives on a small farm in northern New South Wales.

Her website contains resources she has created, such as a free Auslan course and a music course for Deaf people.

== Bibliography ==
=== The Grimstones series ===
1. Hatched (2012)
2. Mortimer Revealed (2012)
3. Whirlwind (2012)
4. Music School (2013)
- The Grimstones Collection (2015)

=== Novels ===
- Future Girl (2020) (Published in the United States as The Words in My Hands (2021))
