= Ann Liang =

Chinese Australian writer (born 2000)

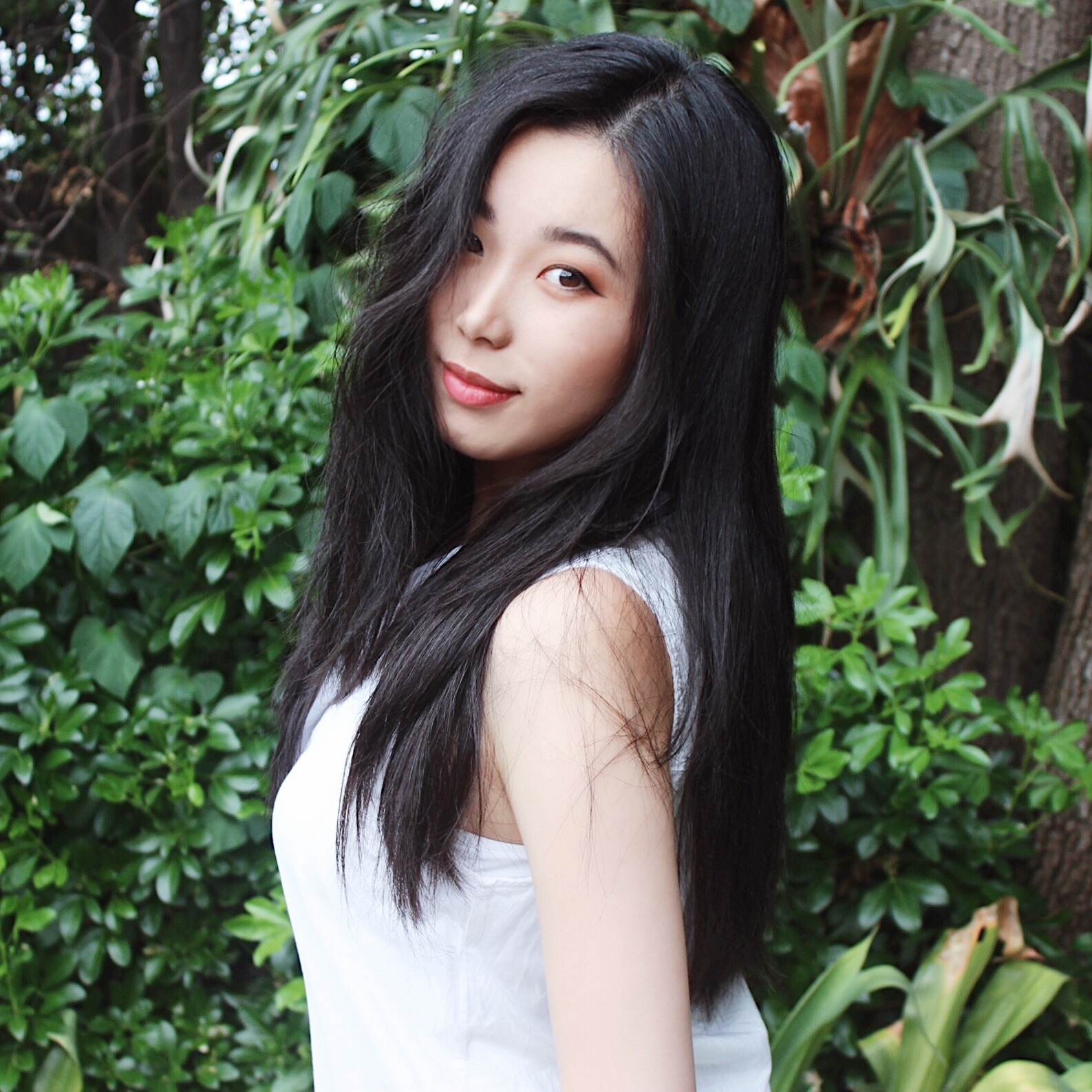
- Liang in 2021
- Born: 8 March 2000 (age 26); Beijing, China
- Education: University of Melbourne
- Occupation: Author
- Writing career
- Years active: 2021–present
- Genres: YA; romance; speculative
- Notable work: If You Could See The Sun (2022)
- Website: annliang.com

Ann Liang (born 8 March 2000) is a Chinese-Australian author best known for her young adult romance novels.

She made her debut in October 2022 with If You Could See the Sun; the book was optioned by Bound Entertainment to develop as a TV series, for which Liang will serve as an executive producer. In October 2024, Liang made her adult debut with A Song to Drown Rivers, which became a Good Morning America book club pick. She has been featured on The Today Show, Cosmopolitan, People, and Harper’s Bazaar.

== Early life and education ==
Ann Liang was born Liang Yuan in Beijing, China, on 8 March 2000. When she was five, she moved to Australia, and was given the name "Ann" as it was short and easy to remember. At age ten, she moved back to Beijing, attending various international schools, the longest attended being Beijing International School. She moved back to Australia when she was fifteen.

Liang read and wrote a lot growing up and was encouraged to become a writer from a very young age, but did not consider it seriously until she was in year eleven. In that same year, in 2016, she published her first work, called "A Sketch of Perfection", in the anthology My First Lesson: Stories Inspired by Laurinda, edited by Alice Pung. At the time of her published novel debut, she had recently graduated from the University of Melbourne with a bachelor's degree in history and communications.

== Career ==
On February 2, 2021, Liang announced through Instagram that she would debuting in fall 2022 with her young adult novel, If You Could See the Sun. The book won the Readings Prize's Young Adult Book Prize, was a finalist for the Aurealis Award for Best Young Adult Novel, and was nominated for the Goodreads Choice Award for Young Adult Fantasy. On October 11, 2022, the release day of If You Could See The Sun, it was announced that a television adaptation would be produced by the Seoul and Los Angeles-based company Bound Entertainment, and that Liang would serve as an executive producer.

On October 19, 2021, Liang announced that she would be releasing her second book, This Time It's Real, in spring 2023.

Liang's third YA novel, I Hope This Doesn't Find You, was released on February 6, 2024. It reached number seven on the New York Times Best Seller list for young adult hardcover books and was a finalist for the Queensland Literary Awards' Young Adult Book Award.

Liang's debut adult novel, A Song To Drown Rivers, was released on October 1, 2024, and was chosen for the Good Morning America book club.

Liang's novel I Am Not Jessica Chen was going to be released in summer 2024, but was pushed back to January 28, 2025.

On August 24, 2024, Liang announced the release of her fifth young adult novel, Never Thought I'd End Up Here, for June 3, 2025. Never Thought I'd End Up Here debuted as number two on the New York Times Best Seller list for young adult hardcover books.

Her seventh young adult book, I Could Give You the Moon, a spinoff to If You Could See the Sun, was released on April 14, 2026.

On July 23, 2026, Liang announced that I Hope This Doesn't Find You would be adapted as a duanju by ReelShort. Casting was announced on October 29 of that year.

Her historical fantasy novel To Dream in Darkness was released on October 27, 2026.

Liang's book The Lost Life of Sylvia Song is set to be released in January 2027.

== Writing style and themes ==
Liang's works center on self-expression and coming-of-age, particularly in the protagonists of her first three young adult novels. Another of her major themes is the Asian diaspora experience; the three main characters are characterized by their lack of language fluency in Mandarin Chinese. This trend continues as a major plot point in Never Thought I'd End Up Here, where Chinese-American Leah Zhang takes a trip to Shanghai and flubs a family wedding toast with her low Mandarin fluency.

Liang's books first two books take place in international schools, a setting from which she departs starting in I Hope This Doesn't Find You. This is influenced by Liang's childhood, as she attended at least six different international schools in Beijing growing up. She also touches upon issues of class and privilege inspired by her wealthy classmates.

Some of Liang's artistic references include Chinese media such as C-dramas and music such as Taylor Swift's discography, with the latter used as a reference to set the mood for her scenes. Liang's earliest inspiration was R.L. Stine. Liang also cites authors R. F. Kuang and Chloe Gong as inspirations, as well as the series The Hunger Games and Shatter Me.

== Publications ==
=== Novels ===
- —— (11 October 2022). If You Could See the Sun. Inkyard Press. ISBN 9780369721754.
- —— (7 February 2023). This Time It's Real. Scholastic Press. ISBN 9780702324291.
- —— (6 February 2024). I Hope This Doesn't Find You. Scholastic Press. ISBN 9781338827163.
- —— (1 October 2024). A Song to Drown Rivers. Pan Macmillan Australia. ISBN 9781761564222.
- —— (28 January 2025). I Am Not Jessica Chen. Inkyard Press. ISBN 9781335523129.
- —— (3 June 2025). Never Thought I'd End Up Here. Scholastic Press. ISBN 9781546110675.
- —— (3 June 2025). I Hope This Finds You. Scholastic Press. ISBN 9798225013813.
- —— (14 April 2026). I Could Give You the Moon. HarperTeen. ISBN 9781335014115.
- —— (23 June 2026). Back To You. Amazon Original Stories. ISBN 9781662543401.
- —— (27 October 2026). To Dream in Darkness. St. Martin's Press. ISBN 9781250289483.
- —— (25 January 2027). The Lost Life of Sylvia Song. Scholastic Press. ISBN 9781335008992.
- —— (6 July 2027). Your Name in the Sand. HarperCollins. ISBN 9798225014797.

=== Anthologies ===
- —— (1 September 2016). "A Sketch of Perfection". In Pung, Alice (ed.). My First Lesson: Stories Inspired by Laurinda. Penguin Books Australia. ISBN 9781925435252.

== Personal life ==
Liang has a younger sister named Alyssa. In an interview, she stated that her Chinese name is a combination of her parents' names.

Aside from English, Liang is fluent in Mandarin. In an interview with Penguin Books Australia, she stated that she did an internship with a Chinese entertainment news company, which she also used as an inspiration for This Time It's Real. She is represented by Kathleen Rushall of Andrea Brown Literary Agency.

== Awards ==
Year	Title	Award	Category	Result	Ref.
2022	If You Could See the Sun	Goodreads Choice Awards	Young Adult Fantasy & Science Fiction	Nominated	
2022	If You Could See the Sun	Aurealis Award	Young Adult Novel	Finalist	
2023	If You Could See the Sun	Readings Prize	Young Adult Book	Won	
2024	I Hope This Doesn't Find You	Queensland Literary Awards	Young Adult Book	Finalist	
2026	I Am Not Jessica Chen	Locus Award	Young Adult Novel	Pending	
