= Future Girl =

2020 novel by Asphyxia

- Author: Asphyxia
- Illustrator: Asphyxia
- Genre: Dystopia
- Publisher: Allen & Unwin
- Publication date: 2020
- ISBN: 9781760294373

Future Girl, published in the United States as The Words in My Hands, is a 2020 novel written and illustrated by Asphyxia. It follows a girl in a dystopian future Australia who learns to embrace her Deafness and growing her own food.

== Plot ==
Piper McBride is a Deaf girl living in a dystopian future Melbourne, Victoria where the food supply is strictly controlled by the corporation Organicore and "wild food" is viewed as dangerous. After her mother is fired from Organicore and they are forced to rent out their house, Piper befriends Marley, a hearing boy with a deaf mother, who teaches her how to grow natural food. Having been raised orally by her mother who makes her wear hearing aids and lip read, Marley and his mother also help Piper learn about Deaf culture and Auslan. The book's text is accompanied by illustrations by Asphyxia.

== Reception ==
The book received starred reviews from Kirkus Reviews, Publishers Weekly, and School Library Journal. Kirkus Reviews described it as a "gentle yet honest story [that] is true to one Deaf experience and is a pleasure to read."

BookTrust called it a "powerful love story, with equally powerful messages about climate change, self-sufficiency, different experiences of deafness, inclusion and fitting in."

A review on Reading Time, a blog for the Children's Book Council of Australia, noted how the book realistically portrayed the difficulties of lipreading and how Marley, despite helping Piper learn about Deaf culture and food-growing, has his own flaws and Piper is not reliant on him. The reviewer concluded that Future Girl "was eye-opening about some of the issues around accessible communication for the Deaf community and the credible suggestion that young people can take action when those in power lead us down the wrong path."

== Awards ==
Year	Award	Result	Ref.
2022	Schneider Family Book Award - Young Adult	Won	
2022	American Library Association's Best Fiction for Young Adults	Included	
2021	Readings Prize - Young Adult	Won	
2021	Indies Book Award	Finalist	
2020	Aurealis Awards	Finalist	
