= Readings Prize =

Australian literary award

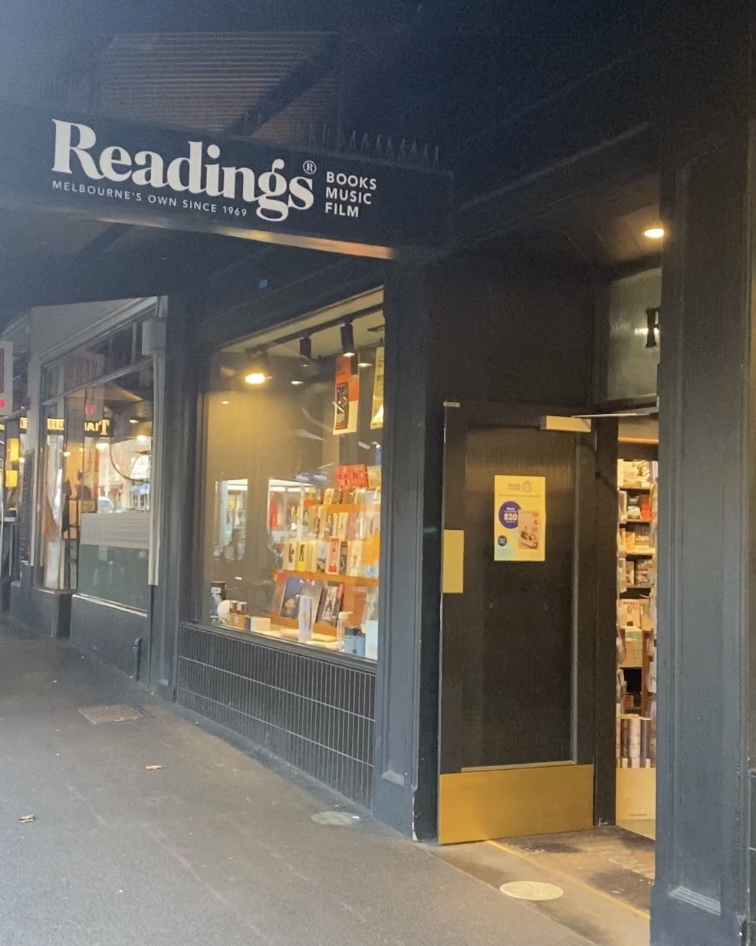
Readings Bookshop in Carlton, the flagship store and home of the Readings Prize

The Readings Prize is an Australian literary award for fiction by emerging authors. Held by Melbourne independent bookseller Readings since 2014, the prizes are awarded in three categories: Readings New Australian Fiction Prize, Readings Children's Prize, Readings Young Adult Book Prize, as well as the Gab Williams Prize, which is chosen from the Young Adult shortlist.

== History ==
The Readings Prize is run by Readings bookstores, an independent Melbourne bookseller with eight stores, established in 1969. The Readings Prize was launched in 2014. Readings owner Mark Rubbo said about the awards: "It can be difficult for debut and second-time authors to attract attention, especially when the heavy-hitters dominate the media. We established the prizes to attract readers who might not necessarily pick up these books otherwise".

In 2016, Readings won International Bookstore of the Year at the London Book Fair, a category open to all stores outside of the UK.

In 2023, Readings awarded an additional prize for young adult fiction, named the Gab Williams Prize in honour of young adult author and former prize manager Gab Williams, who died in January 2023. The winner of this prize is chosen by the Readings Teen Advisory Board, who are readers aged between 14 and 19 years, from the Readings YA Book Prize shortlist. The inaugural winner of the Gab Williams Prize was Completely Normal (and Other Lies) by Biffy James (HGCP) in 2023.

Winners of the New Australian Fiction Prize have included Jessica Au, Alice Robinson, Andrew Pippos, Jennifer Down, Elizabeth Tan, Stephanie Bishop, and Sam Carmody.

== Description ==
The Readings Prize comprises three separate categories of fiction: Children's, Young Adult, and New Australian Fiction, with the prizes named the Readings New Australian Fiction Prize, Readings Children's Prize, and Readings Young Adult Book Prize. The Gab Williams Prize is chosen from the Young Adult shortlist. The aim of the Readings Prize is to recognise and reward "debut and second-time authors of children's, young adult, and new Australian fiction", The winner of the Gab Williams Prize is chosen by the Readings Teen Advisory Board, who are readers aged between 14 and 19 years, from the Readings YA Book Prize shortlist. and the prizes chosen by teams of Readings staff are awarded based on literary merit.

The Readings Prize total prize pool is A$16,000; the winner of each category receives $5,000, while the winner of the Gab Williams Prize receives $1,000.

== Past shortlists and winners ==
Year	Prize	Shortlist	Winner
2024	New Australian Fiction Prize	Ghost Cities (Siang Lu); No Church in the Wild (Murray Middleton); Salt River Road (Molly Schmidt); The Opposite of Success (Eleanor Elliott Thomas); But the Girl (Jessica Zhan Mei Yu)	Thanks for Having Me (Emma Darragh)
2024	Children's Book Prize	The Lonely Lighthouse of Elston-Fright: An Elston-Fright Tale (Reece Carter, illustrated by Simon Howe); To and Fro (Anton Clifford-Motopi); Get Your Act Together, Doris Kozlowski (Jo Dabrowski); Spies in the Sky (Beverley McWilliams); Batthew Aromascent and the Missing Corpse Flower (Ella Mulvey & John Roebuck)	Wurrtoo (Tylissa Elisara, illustrated by Dylan Finney)
2024	Young Adult Prize	A Way Home (Emily Brewin); Blind Spot (Robyn Dennison); Birdy (Sharon Kernot); The Spider and Her Demons (sydney khoo); A Curse of Salt (Sarah Street)	We Didn't Think It Through (Gary Lonesborough)
2024	The Gab Williams Prize		A Way Home (Emily Brewin)
2023	New Australian Fiction Prize	Time and Tide in Sarajevo (Bronwyn Birdsall, Affirm); A Country of Eternal Light (Paul Dalgarno, Fourth Estate); Hydra (Adriane Howell, Transit Lounge); Funny Ethnics (Shirley Le, Affirm); Search History (Amy Taylor, A&U)	All That's Left Unsaid (Tracey Lien, HQ)
2023	Children's Book Prize	The Bookseller's Apprentice (Amelia Mellor, Affirm); The Eerie Excavation (An Alice England Mystery) (Ash Harrier, Pantera); Evie and Rhino (Neridah McMullin, illus by Astred Hicks, Walker); Sea Glass (Rebecca Fraser, Wombat Books); The Wintrish Girl (Talismans of Fate, Book 1) (Melanie La'Brooy, UQP)	No Words (Maryam Master, Pan)
2023	Young Adult Book Prize	Dancing Barefoot (Alice Boyle, Text); Spice Road (Maiya Ibrahim, Hodderscape); Completely Normal (And Other Lies) (Biffy James, Hardie Grant); The Upwelling (Lystra Rose, Lothian); Where You Left Us (Rhiannon Wilde, UQP)	If You Could See the Sun (Ann Liang, Harlequin Teen)
2023	Gab Williams Prize		Completely Normal (and Other Lies) by Biffy James (HGCP)
2022	New Australian Fiction Prize	Cold Enough for Snow (Jessica Au, Giramondo); Hovering (Rhett Davis, Hachette); Losing Face (George Haddad, UQP); Love & Virtue (Diana Reid, Ultimo); Loveland (Robert Lukins, A&U); Sunbathing (Isobel Beech, A&U)	Cold Enough for Snow (Jessica Au, Giramondo)
2022	Children's Book Prize	A Glasshouse of Stars (Shirley Marr, Puffin); Little Gem (Anna Zobel, Puffin); My Brother Ben (Peter Carnavas, UQP); The Sugarcane Kids and the Red Bottomed Boat (Charlie Archbold, Text); Treasure in the Lake (Jason Pamment, A&U); Wylah the Koorie Warrior #1: Guardians (Jordan Gould & Richard Pritchard, Albert Street Books)	The Sugarcane Kids and the Red Bottomed Boat (Charlie Archbold, Text)
2022	Young Adult Book Prize	The Museum of Broken Things (Lauren Draper, Text); Sugar Town Queens (Malla Nunn, A&U); Sunburnt Veils (Sara Haghdoosti, Wakefield Press); Underground (Mirranda Burton, A&U); We Who Hunt the Hollow (Kate Murray, Hardie Grant Children's); What We All Saw (Mike Lucas, Penguin)	Underground (Mirranda Burton, A&U)
2021	New Australian Fiction Prize	New Animal (Ella Baxter, A&U); She is Haunted (Paige Clark, A&U); Echolalia (Briohny Doyle, Vintage); Lucky's (Andrew Pippos, Picador); Song of the Crocodile (Nardi Simpson, Hachette); Born into This (Adam Thompson, UQP)	Lucky's (Andrew Pippos, Picador)
2021	Children's Book Prize	The Power of Positive Pranking (Nat Amoore, Puffin); The Year the Maps Changed (Danielle Binks, Lothian); Aussie Kids: Meet Taj at the Lighthouse (Maxine Beneba Clarke, illus by Nicki Greenberg, Puffin); The Grandest Bookshop in the World (Amelia Mellor, Affirm); Bindi (Kirli Saunders, illus by Dub Leffler, Magabala Books); As Fast as I Can (Penny Tangey, UQP)	As Fast as I Can (Penny Tangey, UQP)
2021	Young Adult Book Prize	The F Team (Rawah Arja, Giramondo); Future Girl (Asphyxia, A&U); The End of the World is Bigger Than Love (Davina Bell, Text); The Boy From the Mish (Gary Lonesborough, A&U); Metal Fish, Falling Snow (Cath Moore, Text); Where We Begin (Christie Nieman, Pan)	Future Girl (Asphyxia, A&U)
2020	New Australian Fiction Prize	The Animals in That Country (Laura Jean McKay, Scribe); Dolores (Lauren Aimee Curtis, W&N); Lucky Ticket (Joey Bui, Text); A Lonely Girl is a Dangerous Thing (Jessie Tu, A&U); Smart Ovens for Lonely People (Elizabeth Tan, Brio); The House of Youssef (Yumna Kassab, Giramondo)	Smart Ovens for Lonely People (Elizabeth Tan)
2020	Children's Book Prize	Pie in the Sky (Remy Lai, Walker Books); The Dog Runner (Bren MacDibble, A&U); Wombat, Mudlark, and Other Stories (Helen Milroy, Fremantle Press); Sherlock Bones & the Natural History Mystery (Renée Treml, A&U); The Girl, the Cat and the Navigator (Matilda Woods, Scholastic); The Secrets of Magnolia Moon (Edwina Wyatt, illus by Katherine Quinn, Walker Books)	The Girl, the Cat and the Navigator (Matilda Woods, Scholastic)
2020	Young Adult Book Prize	Devil's Ballast (Meg Caddy, Text); The Surprising Power of a Good Dumpling (Wai Chim, A&U); Ghost Bird (Lisa Fuller, UQP); Invisible Boys (Holden Sheppard, Fremantle Press); Everywhere Everything Everyone (Katy Warner, Hardie Grant Egmont); Take the Shot (Susan White, Affirm)	Ghost Bird (Lisa Fuller, UQP)
2019	New Australian Fiction Prize	A Constant Hum (Alice Bishop, Text); Inappropriation (Lexi Freiman, A&U); The Flight of Birds (Joshua Lobb, Sydney University Press); A Superior Spectre (Angela Meyer, Ventura); This Taste for Silence (Amanda O'Callaghan, UQP); The Glad Shout (Alice Robinson, Affirm)	The Glad Shout (Alice Robinson, Affirm)
2019	Children's Book Prize	Ice Wolves: Elementals Book One (Amie Kaufman, HarperCollins); The Orchard Underground (Mat Larkin, Hardie Grant Egmont); Real Pigeons Fight Crime (Andrew McDonald, illus by Ben Wood, Hardie Grant Egmont); Black Cockatoo (Carl Merrison & Hakea Hustler, Magabala); The Peacock Detectives (Carly Nugent, Text); Ottilie Colter and the Narroway Hunt (Rhiannon Williams, Hardie Grant Egmont)	The Peacock Detectives (Carly Nugent)
2019	Young Adult Book Prize	Highway Bodies (Alison Evans, Echo); What I Like About Me (Jenna Guillaume, Pan); Stone Girl (Eleni Hale, Penguin); Making Friends with Alice Dyson (Poppy Nwosu, Wakefield); Unmasked (Young Adult Edition) (Turia Pitt, Random House); The Learning Curves of Vanessa Partridge (Clare Strahan, A&U)	Stone Girl (Eleni Hale, Penguin)
2018	New Australian Fiction Prize	Flames (Robbie Arnott, Text); Pulse Points (Jennifer Down, Text); The Fireflies of Autumn (Moreno Giovannoni, Black Inc.); Pink Mountain on Locust Island (Jamie Marina Lau, Brow Books); The Town (Shaun Prescott, Brow Books); The Lucky Galah (Tracey Sorensen, Picador)	Pulse Points (Jennifer Down, Text)
2018	Children's Book Prize	Tarin of the Mammoths: The Exile (Jo Sandhu, Penguin); Nevermoor: The Trials of Morrigan Crow (Jessica Townsend, Lothian); Lintang and the Pirate Queen (Tamara Moss, Random House); The Boy, the Bird and the Coffin Maker (Matilda Woods, Scholastic); The Extremely Inconvenient Adventures of Bronte Mettlestone (Jaclyn Moriarty, A&U); Home Time (Campbell Whyte, Top Shelf Productions)	Tarin of the Mammoths: The Exile (Jo Sandhu, Penguin)
2018	Young Adult Book Prize	Small Spaces (Sarah Epstein, Walker Books); Amelia Westlake (Erin Gough, Hardie Grant Egmont); Between Us (Clare Atkins, Black Inc.); This Mortal Coil (Emily Suvada, Penguin); Beautiful Mess (Claire Christian, Text); Untidy Towns (Kate O'Donnell, UQP)	Amelia Westlake (Erin Gough, Hardie Grant Egmont)
2017	New Australian Fiction Prize	Australia Day (Melanie Cheng, Text); Jean Harley Was Here (Heather Taylor Johnson, UQP); The Good People (Hannah Kent, Picador); The Lost Pages (Marija Peričić, A&U); From the Wreck (Jane Rawson, Transit Lounge)	The Windy Season (Sam Carmody)
2016	New Australian Fiction Prize	Portable Curiosities (Julie Koh, UQP); The High Places (Fiona McFarlane, Hamish Hamilton); Wood Green (Sean Rabin, Giramondo); Ruins (Rajith Savanadasa, Hachette); Salt Creek (Lucy Treloar, Picador)	Music and Freedom (Zoë Morrison)
2015	New Australian Fiction Prize	Last Day in the Dynamite Factory (Annah Faulkner, Picador); In the Quiet (Eliza Henry-Jones, HarperCollins); Arms Race (Nic Low, Text); Hot Little Hands (Abigail Ulman, Hamish Hamilton); Heat and Light (Ellen van Neerven, UQP)	The Other Side of the World (Stephanie Bishop)
2014	New Australian Fiction Prize	After Darkness (Christine Piper, A&U); An Elegant Young Man (Luke Carman, Giramondo); Foreign Soil (Maxine Beneba Clarke, Hachette); The Night Guest (Fiona McFarlane, Hamish Hamilton); The Tribe (Michael Mohammed Ahmad, Giramondo)	Only the Animals (Ceridwen Dovey)
