= Cold Enough for Snow =

2022 novel by Jessica Au

- Author: Jessica Au
- Language: English
- Genre: Literary fiction
- Publisher: Fitzcarraldo Editions
- Publication date: February 23, 2022
- Publication place: Australia
- Pages: 144
- ISBN: 9780811231558 Paperback

Cold Enough for Snow is a 2022 novel by Jessica Au. It won the 2023 Prime Minister's Literary Award for Fiction and the Victorian Premier's Literary Award in the Fiction and Overall categories. It was also shortlisted for the 2023 Miles Franklin Award.

== Plot ==
The novel involves an unnamed mother and daughter who live in different cities in an unnamed Western country and have not seen each other for some years. The daughter arranges for them to meet in Tokyo and travel through Japan, following her carefully planned agenda. Her mother, initially reluctant, comes only after her daughter pushes. In Japan, they visit art galleries, parks, shops, temples, and churches, and tea shops, sharing meals in small restaurants.

The daughter narrates everything, and the mother's few words are only reported second-hand. The title comes from a question the mother asks before the trip because she'd never seen snow.

There are occasional flashbacks in which the narrator recalls her absent sister and her family, her dead uncle in Hong Kong, and her lover, Laurie, who had accompanied her on her previous trip to Japan. She recalls the story she was told many times as a child of the love affair her uncle had as a young man, but when she asks her family about it, neither her sister nor her mother remember the story.

At times, the mother does not participate fully in the daughter's plans. She waits outside a gallery while her daughter goes in, and she does not bring hiking boots, so that she cannot go on a mountain walk. Rather than changing plans, the daughter travels by train to a nearby town then does the walk back towards her mother.

At one point, the mother disappears. When the daughter asks the innkeeper about her mother's whereabouts, the innkeeper claims that the daughter was staying alone. "When my mother finally appeared, she might as well have been an apparition. She came with her puffer jacket zipped up to her chin, and in the cold night air her breath came out in a little cloud, like a small departing spirit" (p. 90).

== Reception ==
=== Reviews ===
Cold Enough for Snow was generally well received by critics, including starred reviews from Kirkus Reviews, who called it "a beautifully observed book, written in precise, elegant prose that contains a wealth of deep feeling."

In a highly positive review, Tobias Grey, writing for The New York Times Book Review, noted, "Au's novel, written without any chapter breaks, deftly uses stream of consciousness to explore the legacy of inherited family traits and the difficulty of breaking away." Grey compared "the way that Au injects matter-of-fact descriptions with existential angst" to "Albert Camus." Claire Messud of Harper's Magazine similarly discussed the Au's writing style and the impact of that style: "The tenor of the narration is hardly effusive. Yet the effect is of the gentle quiet of snowfall, rather than the lethal frigidity of an icicle ... Au's is a book of deceptive simplicity, weaving profound questions of identity and ontology into the fabric of quotidian banality ... Not much happens in Au's novel...but nonetheless, significant emotions, memories, and thoughts are meaningfully conveyed. What matters, the novel reassures us, is constantly imbricated with the everyday, just as alienation and tender care can coexist in the same moment." Financial Times's Baya Simons said, "Au's prose is precise and finely grained ... This makes the occasional imprecision — an unexplained switch in subject, a simile that doesn't land — feel deflating, disillusioning even. Furthermore, her close narration style and a lack of dialogue give rise to a sense of claustrophobia: what is not being said?" The Sydney Morning Herald's Declan Fry wrote, "One of the novella's neat turns lies in how precisely and matter-of-factly it narrates events that are – as we come to realise – anything but ... There is the sense, too, that as Au cultivates her own voice – one that could belong to no one else; a voice she seems so far to have withheld from us, if not herself – we will see the full emergence of her talent."

Publishers Weekly provided a mixed review, saying, "Some readers will find their patience tried by the vague Tokyo episodes, but Au exquisitely conjures the family's nebulous past, and is at her best when folding in the perspectives of other family members. Once this probing and surprising text catches hold, it leaves the reader with lingering questions." The Irish Times also proffered a mixed review, saying,

Cold Enough for Snow is a strange, slim volume, written in gentle, sometimes graceful, prose ... there's a sadistic aspect to [the main] character, and her diligent perfectionism proves wearisome ... Generally, with such an unreliable narrator, a reader is at least fascinated by their perspective, or the story itself. Unfortunately, although this character's mixture of heightened self-awareness and total obliviousness is curious, it's never quite interesting enough to carry the non-events of the book. Often she's trite to the point of cliche ... In spite of moments of beauty, what can most truthfully be said of Cold Enough for Snow is that it is inoffensive. It will suit some readers ... while quickly leaving the minds of others. Although it improved upon rereading, in the end it was so understated that it left me unsure as to whether Jessica Au's writing was subtle to the point of genius, or just a little dull.

=== Awards and honors ===
The New Yorker included Cold Enough for Snow in their list of the best books of 2022. The Guardian included it on their list of the 25 best Australian books of 2022. InDaily named it one of the best eight books of 2022.

Year	Award	Category	Result	Ref.
2020	Novel Prize	—	Won	
2022	The Age Book of the Year Award	Fiction	Shortlisted	
2022	Queensland Literary Award	Fiction	Shortlisted	
2022	Readings Prize	Fiction	Won	
2023	Indie Book Awards		Longlisted	
2023	International Dublin Literary Award	—	Longlisted	
2023	Miles Franklin Award	—	Shortlisted	
2023	Prime Minister's Literary Awards	Fiction	Won	
2023	Victorian Premier's Literary Awards	Victorian Premier's Prize for Fiction	Won	
2023	Victorian Premier's Literary Awards	Victorian Prize for Literature	Won	
