= Winsingad =

Microsoft software for singing training

WinSingad is a Microsoft Windows based software for singing training.

== Description ==
WinSingad is software for singing training. It started life as SINGAD, which stands for "SINGing Assessment and Development", running on a BBC Micro and it was designed for use in primary schools to develop and assess children's singing pitching skills.

It was later ported to the Atari range of computers to take advantage of MIDI and more recently to Windows. SINGAD enabled the pitching strategies used by children to be explored and compared with adult singers and its use for real-time visual feedback in singing training was beneficial.

== WinSingad displays ==
WinSingad offers displays of:

- Input sound waveform against time
- Fundamental frequency against time
- Short-term spectrum
- Narrow band spectrogram
- Spectral ratio against time
- Vocal tract area
- Mean/min vocal tract area against time.

In addition, a web camera window is often placed on screen with the camera positioned at the singer's side to provide a side view to enable posture to be viewed. In effect, this is a 90 degree mirror which gives a clear indication of spine alignment.
