= Jessica Au =

Australian editor and bookseller, and author

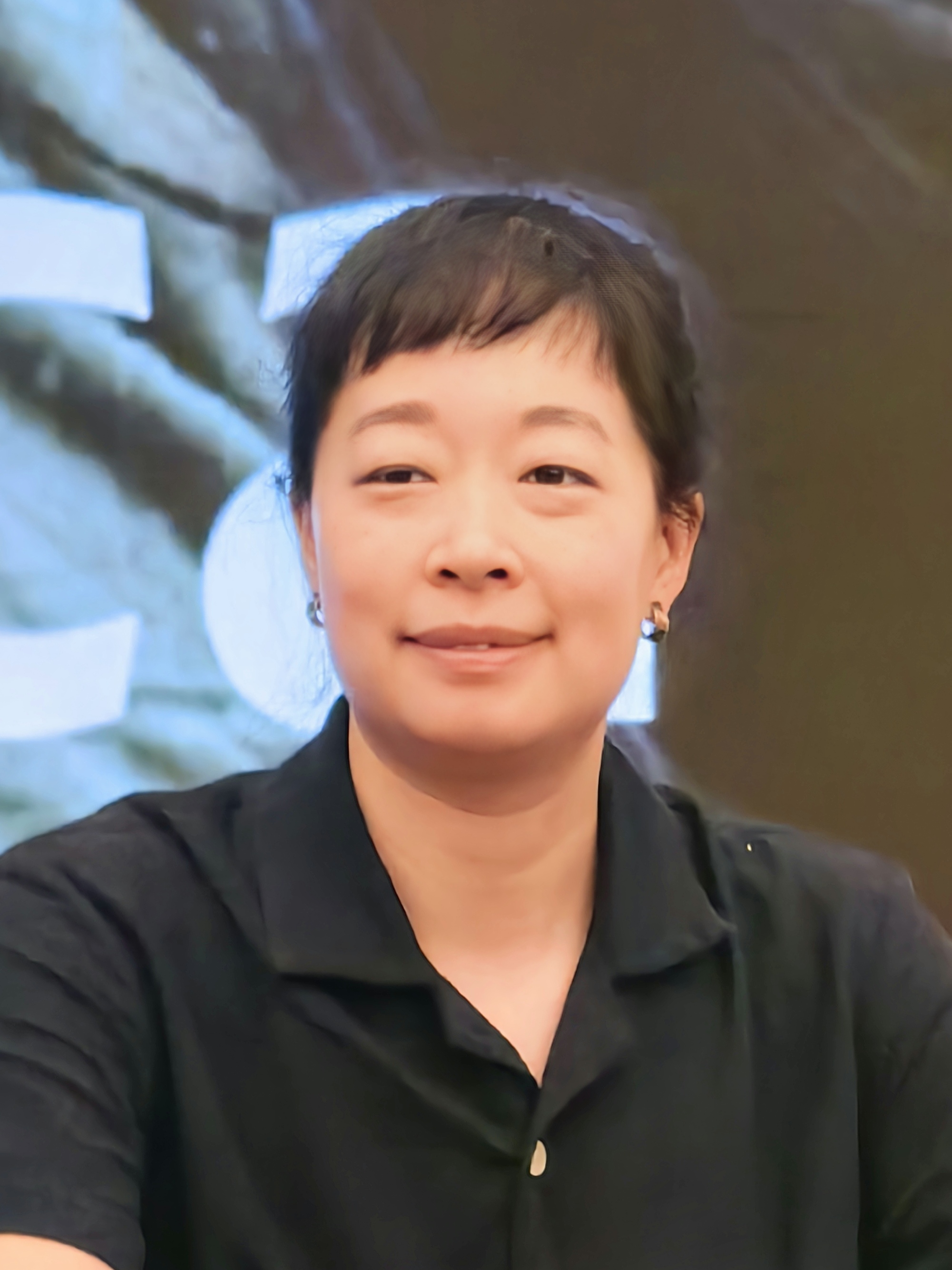
- Occupation: Novelist
- Writing career
- Genres: Fiction, novels
- Notable work: Cold Enough for Snow
- Website: www.jessicaau.com

Jessica Au is an Australian editor and bookseller, and author of the novels Cargo and Cold Enough for Snow. Au won the inaugural Novel Prize in 2022. She is based in Melbourne.

Au won the 2023 Prime Minister's Literary Award for Fiction and both the 2023 Victorian Premier's Prize for Literature and Victorian Premier's Prize for Fiction for Cold Enough for Snow.

Au's book Cold Enough for Snow has been added to NESA's Year 12 English Advanced syllabus (2024) as a prescribed text for the Focus Area: Texts and Human Experiences. Where students are requested to deepen their understanding of how texts represent individual and collective human experiences.

== Awards and honours ==
Year	Title	Award	Category	Result	Ref.
2020	Cold Enough for Snow	Novel Prize	—	Won	
2022	Cold Enough for Snow	The Age Book of the Year Award	Fiction	Shortlisted	
2022	Cold Enough for Snow	Queensland Literary Award	Fiction	Shortlisted	
2022	Cold Enough for Snow	Readings Prize	Fiction	Won	
2023	Cold Enough for Snow	Indie Book Awards	Fiction	Longlisted	
2023	Cold Enough for Snow	International Dublin Literary Award	—	Longlisted	
2023	Cold Enough for Snow	Miles Franklin Award	—	Shortlisted	
2023	Cold Enough for Snow	Prime Minister's Literary Awards	Fiction	Won	
2023	Cold Enough for Snow	Victorian Premier's Literary Awards	Victorian Premier's Prize for Fiction	Won	
2023	Cold Enough for Snow	Victorian Premier's Literary Awards	Victorian Prize for Literature	Won	

== Publications ==
- Cargo (2011)
- Cold Enough for Snow (2022)
