= Taylor Swift discography =

Taylor Swift discography may refer to:

- Taylor Swift albums discography
- Taylor Swift singles discography
