= Sign singing =

Singing in sign language

Twinkle, Twinkle, Little Star sign sung in Makaton

Music video for French-language song La petite Clémence featuring French-Sign-Language singing

Sign singing or karaoke signing is singing using sign language. Typically a song is played, and the performer expressively performs a sign language version of the lyrics. Whereas vocal singing uses pitch and tone to convey expression, sign singing relies on the performer's hands, body, and facial expressions.

Choirs can perform sign singing and have gathered popularity in recent years as accessibility for the Deaf community and interest in signing languages have risen. Competitions in which sign choirs can compete include the National Signing Choir Competition in the UK.

Well-known sign singers include the Japanese Tomoko Nakayama, a follower of Nichiren Buddhism, and the bawdy Australian duo Dislabelled. In London in 2003, a series of "Deaf Idol" events were held where deaf participants competed in karaoke singing, dance etc., in a similar format to the TV show Pop Idol. Sign language can be used to express extremely nuanced feeling, and so sign singing is an important creative input for the deaf.

Sign singing is featured in the children's movie Napoleon Dynamite during a scene when members of the Happy Hands Club perform a song titled "The Rose" written by Bette Midler, entirely in sign. The signing club depicted in the film was largely inspired by a sign singing club that was previously established at Preston High School (Idaho), where the movie was filmed. The film brought wider attention to the club, originally called The Good Hands Club, which was founded by educator Dan Robertson, who conceived the idea for the group while studying ASL at Brigham Young University. In 2013, the troupe performed on stages at Disneyland, in the Tabernacle in Salt Lake City with the Mormon Tabernacle Choir, and flew to Orlando for the convention of a large corporation.

A sign language interpretation by the late Kimberly Rae Schaefer during Pearl Jam's 2000 tour for "Given to Fly" garnered public attention for the passionate and emotional signing.

The British national anthem was sung and signed in British Sign Language at the Opening Ceremony of the 2012 Olympics by The Kaos Signing Choir for Deaf and Hearing Children.

The 2015 Broadway musical theater production of Spring Awakening integrated American sign language within the choreography of dance moves, while also utilizing a mixture of hearing and deaf performers.

== See also ==
- Types of choirs
