= Elizabeth Tan (author) =

Australian fiction writer (born 1988)

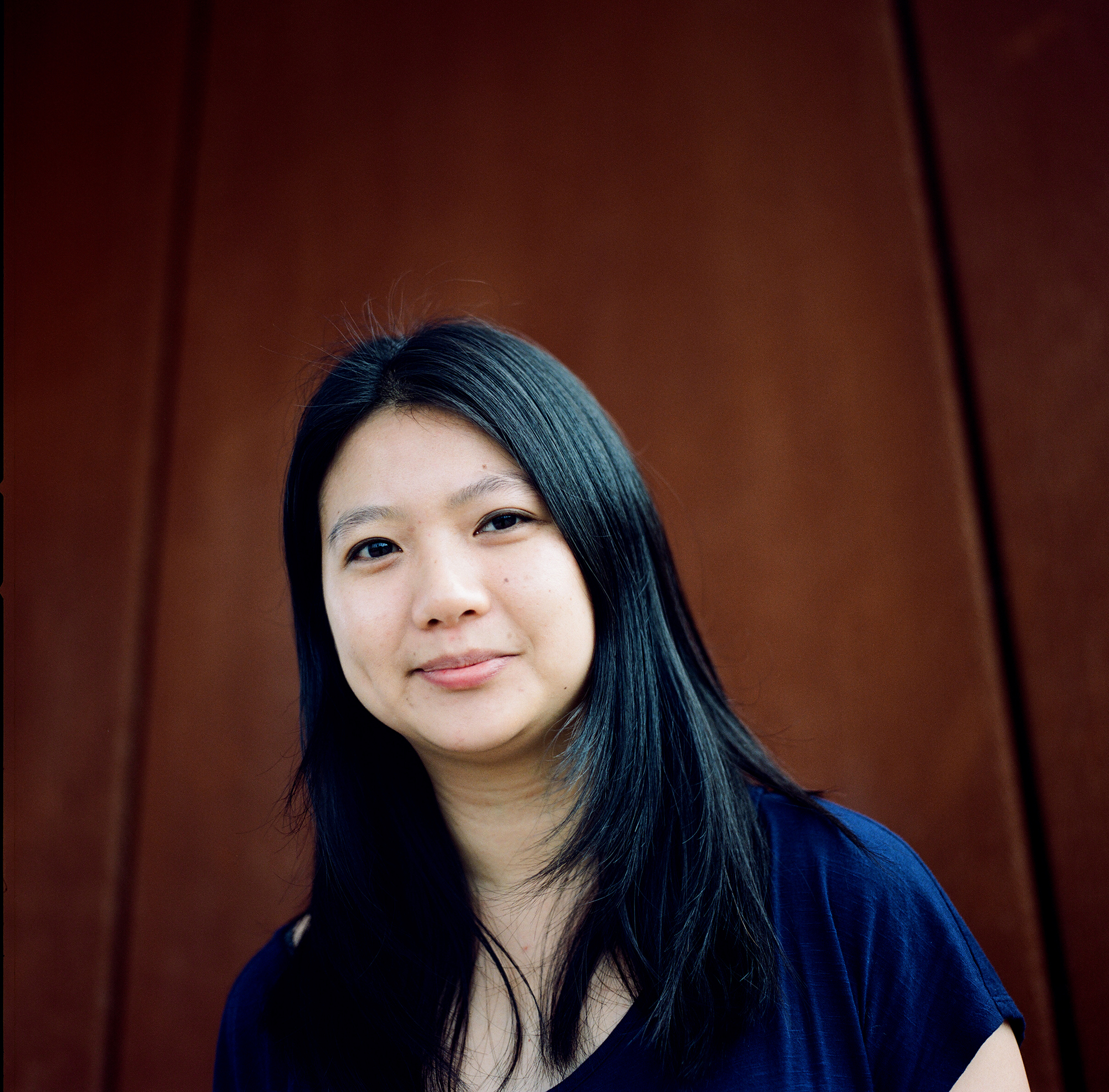
- Born: 1988 (age 37–38); Perth, Australia
- Education: Curtin University
- Writing career
- Notable work: Smart Ovens for Lonely People (2020)
- Notable awards: Readings Prize for New Australian Fiction (2020)
- Literary movement: Postmodernism; Magic realism

Elizabeth Tan (born 1988) is an Australian novelist and short story writer whose short story collection Smart Ovens for Lonely People, published in 2020, was longlisted for the 2021 Stella Prize. Her style is characterised by elements of postmodernism and magic realism, blending experimental structure and voice with fantastical elements. Her narratives critically engage with contemporary societal issues such as feminism and consumerism while incorporating frequent references to Australian popular culture.

== Early life and education ==
Tan was born in Perth, Australia in 1988 to Singaporean parents. After high school, she completed a degree in creative writing. In 2017, she was awarded a Ph.D. in creative writing by Curtin University, where she also tutored as a sessional academic until 2021.

== Works ==
- Rubik (2017), ISBN 9781922267191
- Smart Ovens for Lonely People (2020), ISBN 9781944700577

== Awards ==
=== Smart Ovens for Lonely People (2020) ===
- Barbara Jefferis Award (2022) — shortlisted
- Victorian Premier's Prize for Fiction (2021) — highly commended
- Steele Rudd Award for a Short Story Collection (2021) — longlisted
- Colin Roderick Award (2021) — longlisted
- Stella Prize (2021) — longlisted
- Readings Prize for New Australian Fiction (2020) — winner

=== Shirt Dresses that Look a Little Too Much like Shirts so that It Looks like You Forgot to Put on Pants (Love Will Save the Day) ===
- The Overland Victoria University Short Story Prize for New and Emerging Writers (2017) — shortlisted

=== Rubik (2017) ===
- Mascara Avant-garde Award for Fiction (2018) — shortlisted
