= Al-Furat =

Furat, Forat, Foorat, Al-Furat, Al-Foorat or Al-Forat may refer to:

== Places ==
- Euphrates (Arabic: الفرات, al-Furāt), the longest river in West Asia
  - Al-Furat Dam, or Tabqa Dam, upstream from Raqqa, Syria
- Forat, Iran, a village in Semnan Province

== People ==
- Banu'l-Furat, a 9th–10th century Shia family of civil functionaries of the Abbasid Caliphate
  - Abu'l-Abbas Ahmad ibn al-Furat (died 904)
  - Abu'l-Hasan Ali ibn al-Furat (855–924)
  - Abu'l-Abbas ibn al-Furat (died 1014/5)
  - Ja'far ibn al-Furat (921–1001)
- Ibn al-Furat (1334–1405), an Egyptian historian
- Asad ibn al-Furat (759–828), a jurist and theologian from Ifriqiya
- Bruce Forat, an electronics engineer, founder of Forat Electronics
- Mun'im Furat (1900–1972), an Iraqi artist

== Media ==
- Al Forat, a satellite TV network in Iraq
- Al-Furat (newspaper, Deir ez-Zor), a newspaper in Deir ez-Zor, Syria
- Al-Furat (newspaper, Australia), an Arabic-language newspaper in New South Wales, Australia
- AlFurat Media Center, an Islamic State media organization

== Other uses ==
- Al-Forat FC, an Iraqi football club
- Al-Furat University, a university in Deir ez-Zor, Syria
- Forat F9000, a drum machine and MIDI sequencer
  - Forat F16, drum machine
