= Euphrates (disambiguation) =

The Euphrates is the longest and one of the most historically important rivers of Western Asia.

Euphrates may also refer to:

- Tigris–Euphrates river system
- Euphratensis, a Roman province in Greater Syria, part of the late Roman Diocese of the East
- Euphrates the Stoic (35–118), Stoic philosopher from Tyre, in the Roman province of Syria
- Euphrates jerboa (Allactaga euphratica), a rodent of the family Dipodidae and genus Allactaga
- Euphrates softshell turtle (Rafetus euphraticus), a species of softshell turtle in the family Trionychidae
- Euphrates-class troopship, a five-ship class of iron screw troopships built for the Royal Navy during the 1860s
- HMS Euphrates, for one of several individual ships or shore establishments by the Royal Navy
- Euphrates College, a coeducational high school in Harput (today Elazığ), eastern Turkey
- Euphrates Volcano, a joint operations room established during the Syrian Civil War
- Euphrates River (album), a 1974 album by The Main Ingredient
- "River Euphrates", a song by the Pixies from Surfer Rosa, 1988

== See also ==
- Al-Furat (disambiguation)
