= Akai MPC =

Music workstation

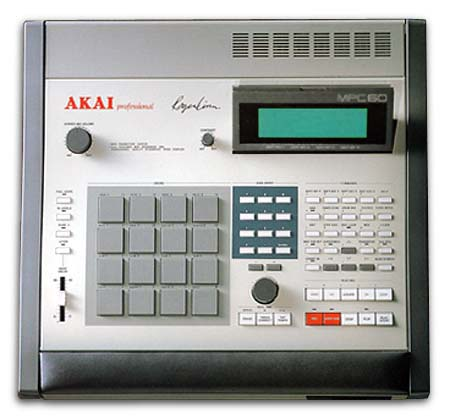
- An Akai MPC60, the first MPC model
- Other names: MIDI Production Center, Music Production Controller
- Classification: Music workstation
- Inventor: Roger Linn
- Developed: 1988

The Akai MPC (originally MIDI Production Center, now Music Production Center) is a series of music workstations produced by Akai from 1988 onwards. MPCs combine sampling and sequencing functions, allowing users to record portions of sound, modify them and play them back as sequences.

The MPC was created by the American engineer Roger Linn, who had designed the successful LM-1 and LinnDrum drum machines in the 1980s. Linn aimed to create an intuitive instrument, with a grid of pads that can be played similarly to a traditional instrument such as a keyboard or drum kit.

The MPC had a major influence on the development of electronic and hip-hop music, and led to new sampling techniques as users pushed its technical limits. It had a democratizing effect on music production, allowing artists to create elaborate tracks without traditional instruments or recording studios. Its pad interface was adopted by numerous manufacturers, became standard in DJ technology. Prominent users of the MPC include DJ Shadow, J Dilla and Kanye West.

== Development ==
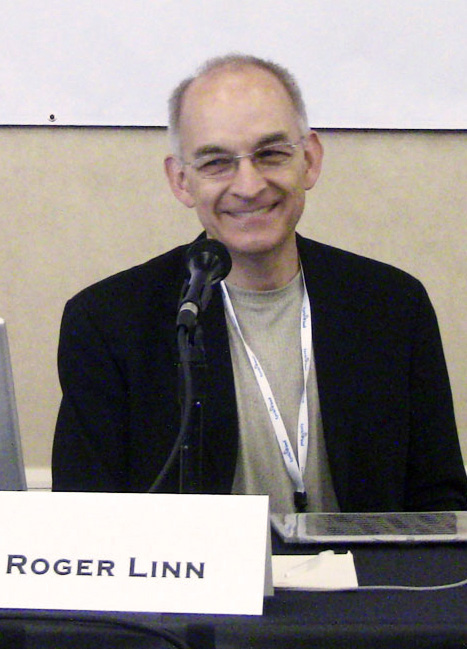
The MPC was created by Roger Linn (pictured in 2010), who also made the LinnDrum.

By the late 1980s, drum machines had become popular for creating beats and loops without instrumentalists, and hip-hop artists were using samplers to take portions of existing recordings and create new compositions. Grooveboxes, machines that combined these functions, such as those by E-mu Systems, required knowledge of music production and cost up to $10,000.

The original MPC, the MPC-60, was a collaboration between the Japanese company Akai and the American engineer Roger Linn. Linn had designed the successful LM-1 and LinnDrum, two of the earliest drum machines to use samples (prerecorded sounds). His company, Linn Electronics, had closed following the failure of the Linn 9000, a drum machine and sampler. According to Linn, his collaboration with Akai "was a good fit because Akai needed a creative designer with ideas and I didn't want to do sales, marketing, finance or manufacturing, all of which Akai was very good at".

Linn described the MPC as an attempt to "properly re-engineer" the Linn 9000. He disliked reading instruction manuals and wanted to create an intuitive interface that simplified music production. He designed the functions, including the panel layout and hardware specification, and created the software with his team. He credited the circuitry to a team led by the English engineer David Cockerell. Akai handled the production engineering, making the MPC "more manufacturable". The first model, the MPC60 (MIDI Production Center), was released on December 8, 1988, and retailed for $5,000. It was followed by the MPC60 MkII and the MPC3000.

After Akai went out of business in 2006, Linn left the company and its assets were purchased by Numark. Akai has continued to produce MPC models without Linn. Linn was critical, saying: "Akai seems to be making slight changes to my old 1986 designs for the original MPC, basically rearranging the deck chairs on the Titanic."

== Features ==
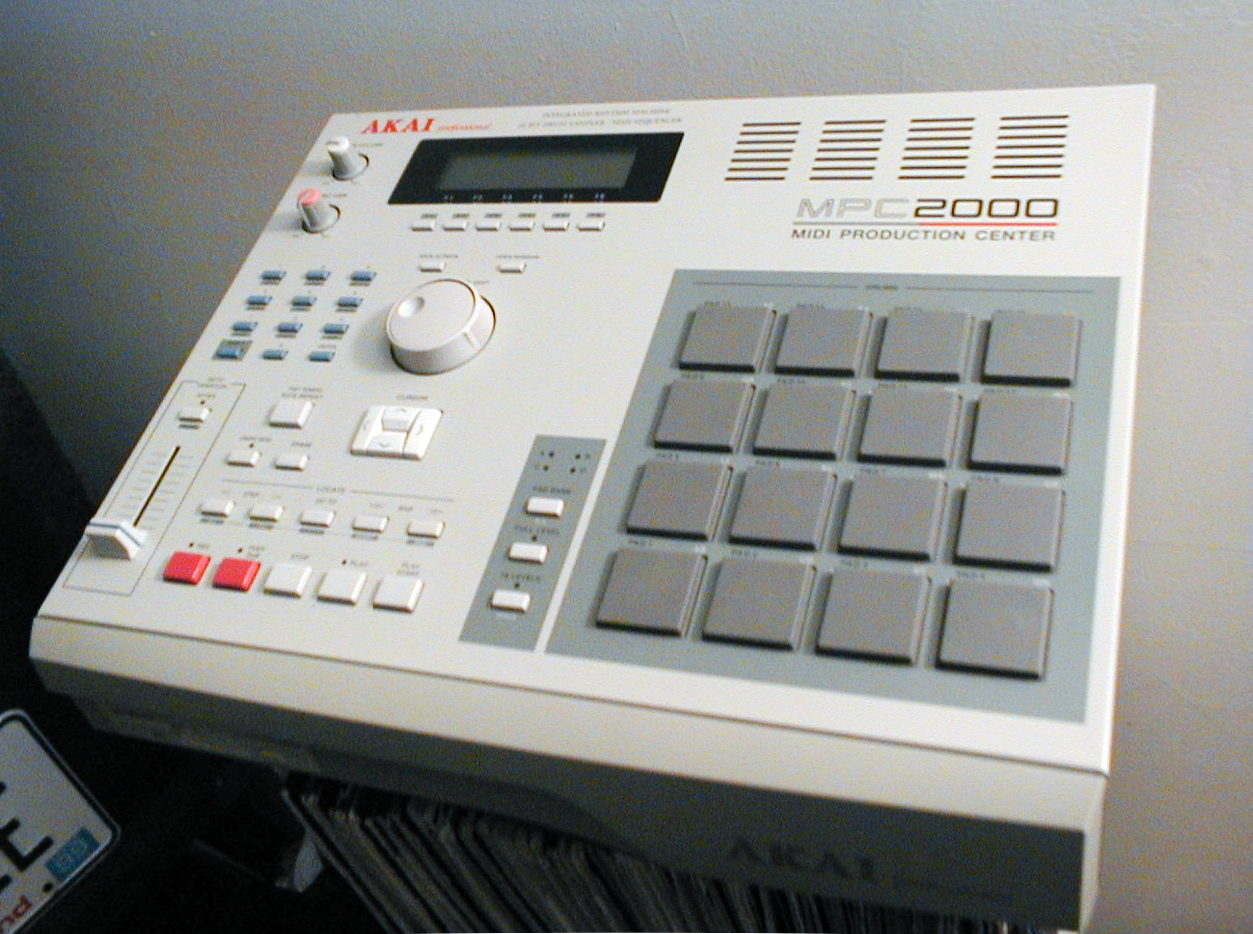
An MPC2000

Instead of the switches and small hard buttons of earlier devices, the MPC has a 4x4 grid of large pressure-sensitive rubber pads which can be played similarly to a keyboard. The interface was simpler than those of competing instruments, and can be connected to a normal sound system, without the need for a studio. According to Vox, "Most importantly, it wasn't an enormous, stationary mixing panel with as many buttons as an airplane cockpit."

Whereas artists had previously sampled long pieces of music, the MPC allowed them to sample smaller portions, assign them to separate pads and trigger them independently, similarly to playing a traditional instrument such as a keyboard or drum kit. Rhythms can be built not just from percussion samples but any recorded sound, such as horns or synthesizers.

The MPC60 only allows sample lengths of up to 13 seconds, as sampling memory was expensive at the time and Linn expected users to sample short sounds to create rhythms rather than long loops. Functions are selected and samples are edited with two knobs. Red "record" and "overdub" buttons are used to save or loop beats. The MPC60 has an LCD screen and came with floppy disks with sounds and instruments.

== Legacy ==
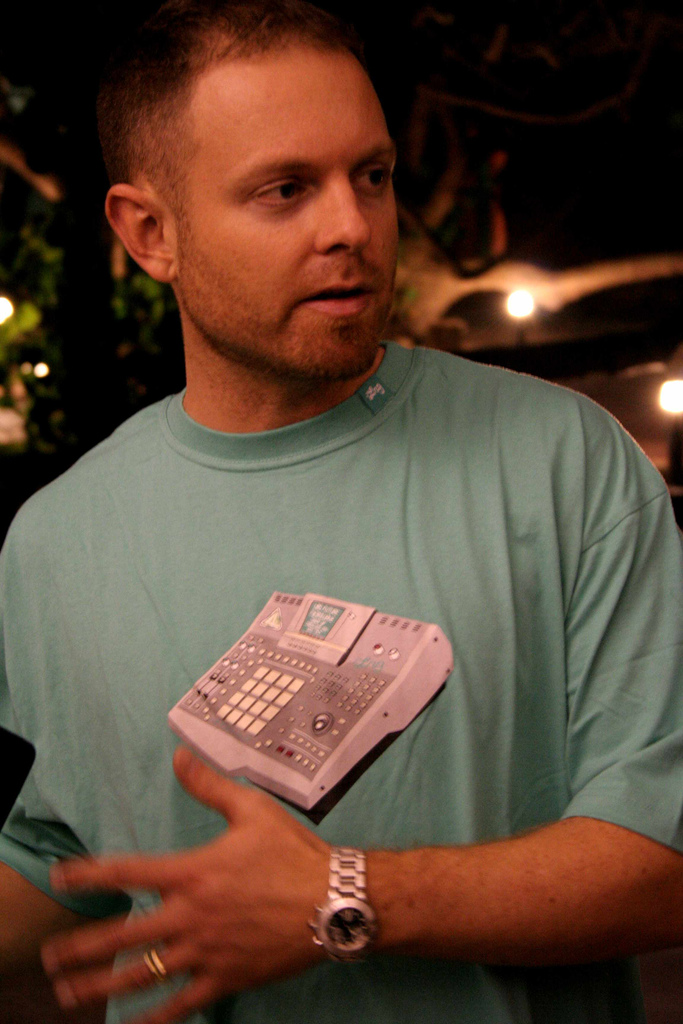
DJ Shadow created his landmark 1996 album Endtroducing with an MPC60 MKII.

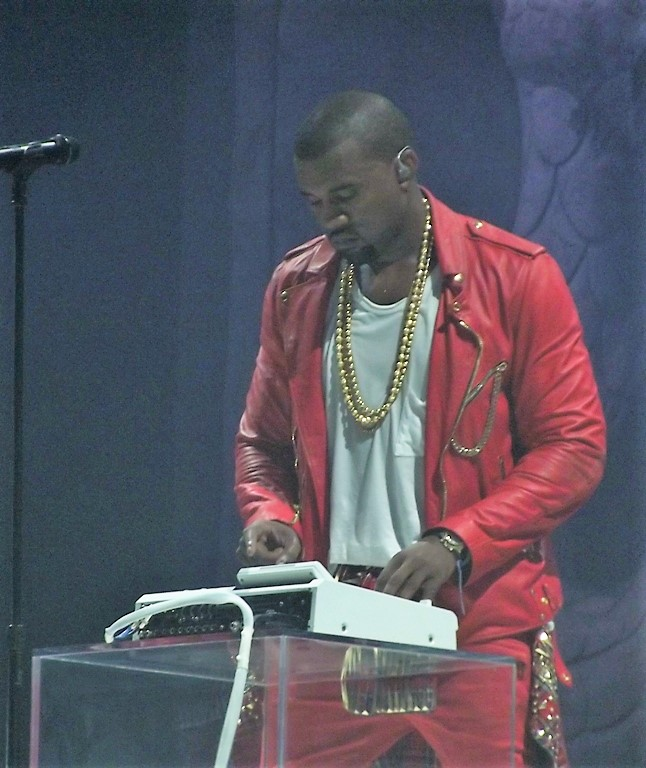
Kanye West performing with an MPC2000XL in 2011

Linn anticipated that users would sample short sounds, such as individual notes or drum hits, to use as building blocks for compositions. However, users began sampling longer passages of music. In the words of Greg Milner, the author of Perfecting Sound Forever, musicians "didn't just want the sound of John Bonham's kick drum, they wanted to loop and repeat the whole of 'When the Levee Breaks'". Linn said: "It was a very pleasant surprise. After 60 years of recording, there are so many prerecorded examples to sample from. Why reinvent the wheel?"

The MPC's ability to create percussion from any sound turned sampling into a new art form and allowed for new styles of music. Its affordability and accessibility had a democratizing effect; musicians could create tracks without a studio or music theory knowledge, and it was inviting to musicians who did not play traditional instruments or had no music education. Vox wrote that the MPC "challenged the notion of what a band can look like". The 4x4 grid of pads was adopted by numerous manufacturers and became standard in DJ technology. As of 2018, the MPC continued to be used even with the advent of digital audio workstations, and used models fetched high prices.

Engadget wrote that the impact of the MPC on hip hop could not be overstated. The rapper Jehst saw it as the next step in the evolution of the hip hop genre after the introduction of the TR-808, TR-909 and DMX drum machines in the 1980s. The producer DJ Shadow used an MPC60 MKII to create his influential 1996 album Endtroducing, which is composed entirely of samples. The producer J Dilla disabled the quantize feature on his MPC to create his signature "off-kilter" sampling style. After J Dilla's death in 2006, his MPC was preserved in the Smithsonian National Museum of African American History and Culture in 2014. The rapper Kanye West used the MPC to compose several of his best-known tracks and much of his breakthrough 2004 album The College Dropout. West closed the 2010 MTV Video Music Awards with a performance of his 2010 track "Runaway" on an MPC2000XL.

== See also ==
- Drum machine
- Groovebox
- Sampler
