= Bruce Forat =

Forat Music and Electronics
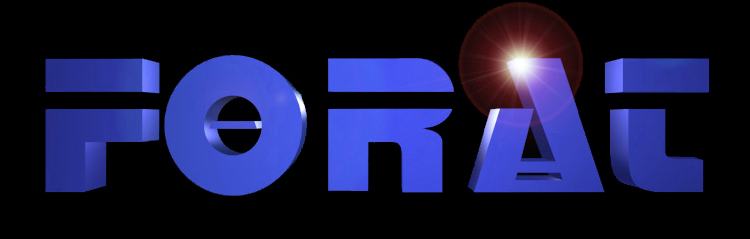
- Type: Corporation
- Industry: Electronic musical instrument design, manufacturing, service, upgrades and customization
- Founded: February 1986
- Headquarters: 11739 Ventura Boulevard, Studio City, California, USA
- Key people: Bruce Forat
- Products: Drum machines, digital samplers, MIDI controllers, custom modifications, digital sound samples
- Subsidiaries: Forat Productions
- Website: forat.com

Bruce Forat is an electronics engineer, computer programmer, music producer, songwriter and co-founder and president of Forat Music and Electronics Corporation, founded in 1986.

He is known for providing samples, service and upgrades for all Linn Electronics products after Linn went out of business in 1986.

He also designed and manufactured the Forat F16 rack mount digital sampler and the Forat F9000: a debugged and improved version of the ill-fated Linn 9000 drum machine.

== Forat Music and Electronics ==
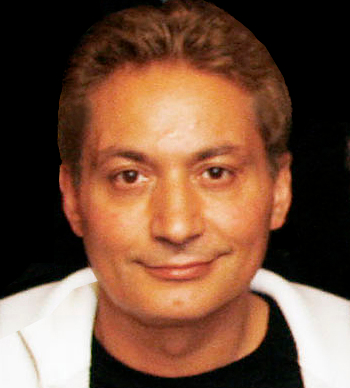
Bruce Forat

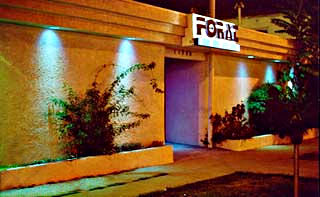
Forat Music and Electronics - Studio City, California, USA

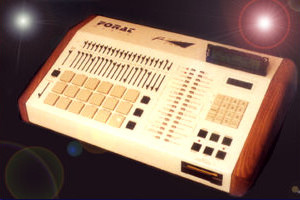
Forat F9000 integrated digital drum machine and MIDI keyboard recorder

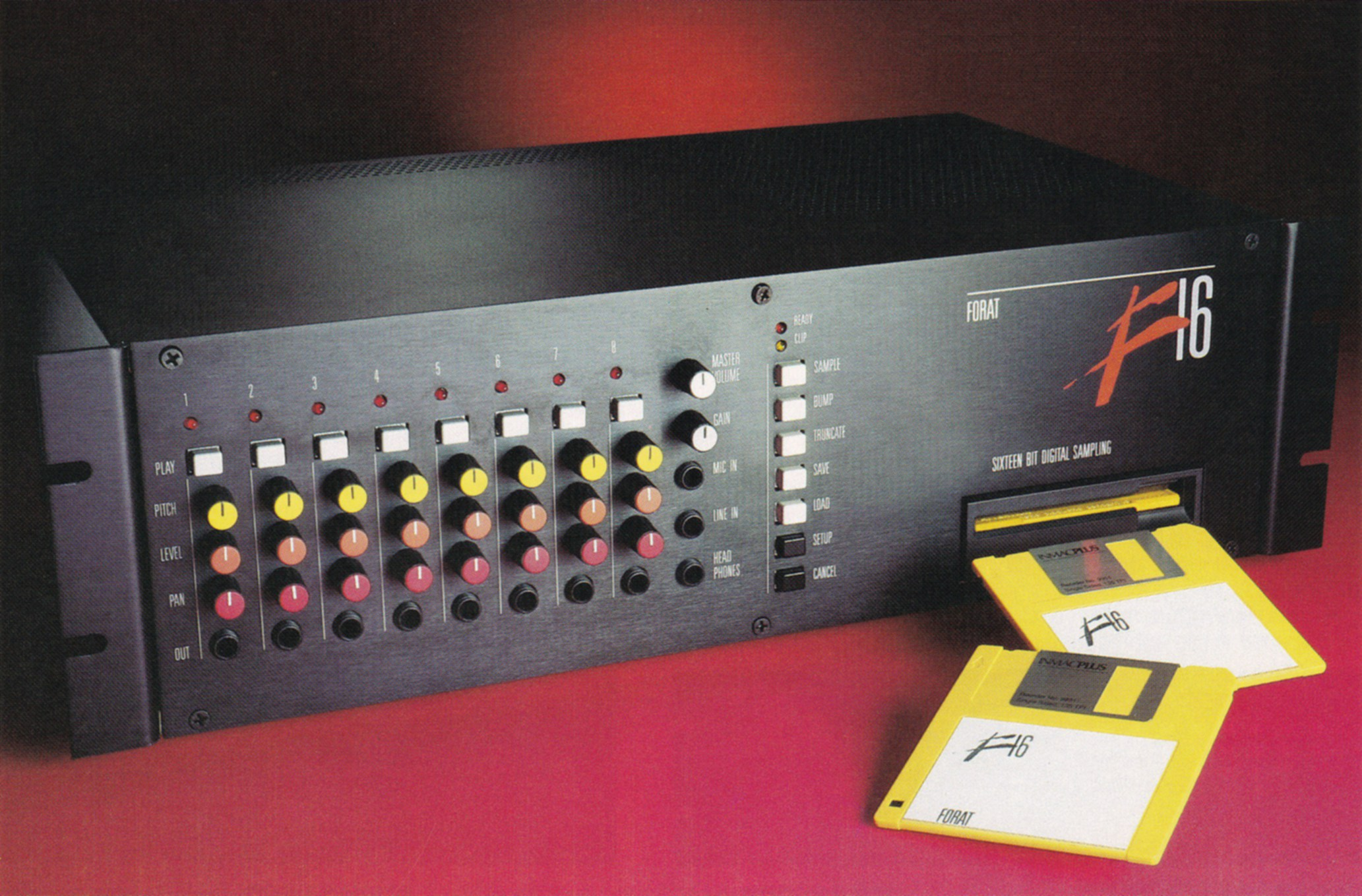
Forat F16 - 16 bit Digital Sampler / Drum Brain

Forat Music and Electronics (also known as Forat Electronics or Forat Music) is a California-based corporation specializing in electronic musical instrument design, manufacturing, service, upgrades and customization, in particular, drum machines and digital samplers.

=== History ===
In 1982, Bruce Forat joined Linn Electronics as an electronics technician. When Linn went out of business in February 1986, brothers Bruce and Ben formed Forat Electronics Corporation in Studio City, California and purchased all of Linn's remaining assets. They hired some former Linn employees including Steve Alcorn, former Vice President of Engineering and Chief Operating Officer.

Forat revamped the original Linn Electronics line, including the LM-1, LinnDrum, and LinnSequencer. They completely reinvented the ill-fated Linn 9000 drum machine and dubbed it the Forat F9000: the first fully functional integrated sampling / sequencing / MIDI work station. They produce software and hardware upgrades and modifications for the Linn 9000, Forat F9000, and the LinnSequencer and modifications, sounds and a MIDI Retrofit Kit for the LinnDrum.

In 1987, Forat introduced the F16: the first 16 bit digital sampler tailored for drummers featuring MIDI capabilities, dynamic response to incoming trigger signals and, with a trigger response time of 0.1 milliseconds, the fastest audio-triggering digital sampler ever sold.

Over the years, Forat has expanded into other aspects of electronic music technology.

Today, they service, upgrade and customize most types of drum machines and many brands of vintage analog synthesizers. They're an authorized service center for Akai, Yamaha & Roland. They provide repairs and upgrades for the Akai line of hard disk recorders, samplers and the entire Akai MPC series of drum machines. They service Yamaha musical products including their line of digital consoles, drum machines and keyboards, the entire Roland line of products including MV series workstations and MC Groove samplers.

They've produced thousands of custom digital sample sounds for use with the Linn 9000, Forat F9000, LinnDrum, Forat F16, Ensoniq ASR-10, Akai MPC series and the Roland MV-8000 & MV-8800.

They've done custom paint jobs on keyboards and most of the Akai MPC and Roland drum machines and music workstations.

In 2012, Bruce Forat worked as a drum machine design consultant for Akai.

At the time of writing (2015), Forat Electronics continues to provide products and services to music artists, producers and engineers around the world.

=== Notable customers ===
According to Forat, there are over 8,000 Forat Electronics F9000s and F16s in use today around the world. Artists, producers and engineers who use Forat products, sounds, services, upgrades and modifications include:

- Atom™ alias Señor Coconut alias Uwe Schmidt
- Kenneth "Babyface" Edmonds
- Glen Ballard (Michael Jackson - Man In The Mirror)
- Marcus Brown (Madonna)
- Def Leppard
- DJ Quick
- Herbie Hancock
- Jimmy Jam and Terry Lewis
- L.A. Reid
- Alan Moulder
- Dave "Hard Drive" Pensado
- John "JR" Robinson (Michael Jackson, Barbra Streisand, Rufus)
- RZA (Wu-Tang Clan)
- Mike Shipley
- Will Smith
- Mike D (Beastie Boys)
- The Latch Brothers
- Mixmaster Mike
- Kenny "Tick" Salcido
- Stock, Aitken & Waterman
- Stevie Wonder
- Wu-Tang Clan

Grammy Award-winning mix engineer, Dave "Hard Drive" Pensado says "the Forat F16 is my little secret weapon."

When Alan Moulder (Nine Inch Nails) was asked: "Is there a piece of equipment you can't do without?" he replied: "I've got a Forat F16 that I use to trigger kicks and snares".
