= LinnSequencer =

MIDI sequencer

LinnDrum Sequencer
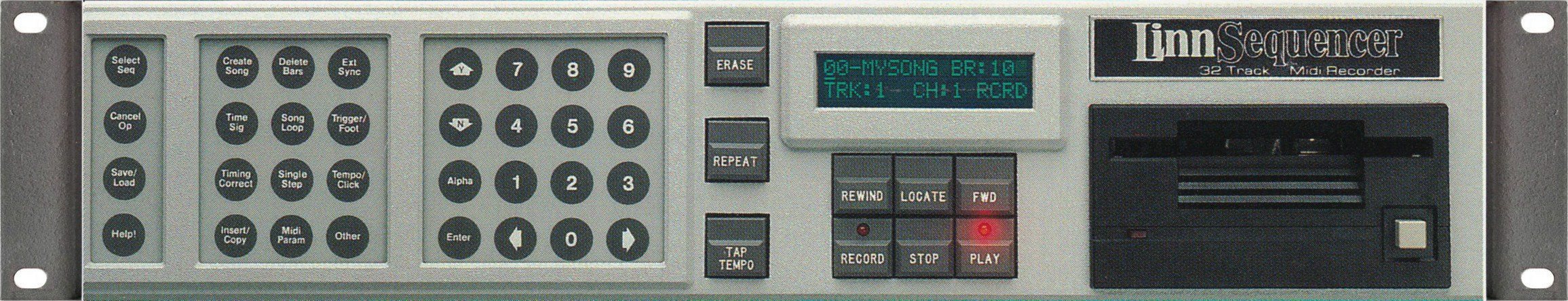
- LinnSequencer - rack mount 32 track hardware MIDI sequencer
- Manufacturer: Linn Electronics

Technical specifications
- Polyphony: 16

Input/output

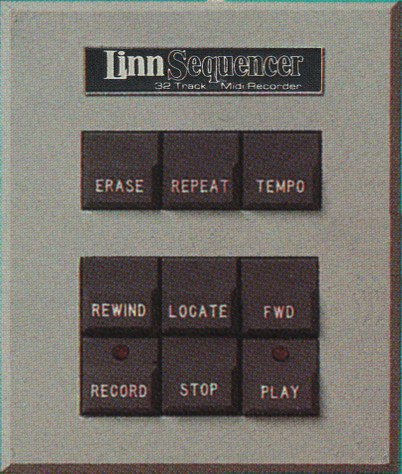
Remote Control

The LinnSequencer is a rack-mount 32-track hardware MIDI sequencer manufactured by Linn Electronics and released in 1985 at a list price of US $1,250. An optional Remote Control was available. Like the LinnDrum Midistudio, the LinnSequencer used the same flawed operating system used in the ill-fated Linn 9000, released in 1984. As a result, both machines earned a reputation for being notoriously unreliable. In addition, the optional LinnSequencer SMPTE feature could not be deployed due to flawed circuit design. The last LinnSequencer operating system released by Linn Electronics was version 5.17.

When Linn went out of business in 1986, Forat Electronics purchased Linn's remaining assets and completely revamped the Linn 9000 and LinnSequencer operating system. They fixed all the bugs and added some new features to the LinnSequencer. The Forat LinnSequencer was released in 1987 by Forat Electronics at a list price of $1,000 (including all fixes and upgrades). The Forat LinnSequencer was manufactured and sold as a new complete unit. Forat also offered software and hardware upgrades to existing LinnSequencers. Forat discontinued manufacturing new complete Forat LinnSequencers in 1994. However, at the time of writing (2015), Forat still offers the LinnSequencer software and hardware upgrades to stock LinnSequencers.

== Features ==
The LinnSequencer is a state-of-the-art composition and performance tool for the professional musician. It is extremely powerful and simple to learn and use.

Features added by Forat Electronics include:

- 40,000-note capacity (four times the original)
- MIDI clock
- MIDI song pointer

Features of the original Linn Electronics LinnSequencer that are retained in the Forat LinnSequencer include:

- Operation is similar to a multi-track tape recorder with PLAY, STOP, RECORD, FAST FORWARD, REWIND, and LOCATE controls
- Each of the 100 sequences contains 32 simultaneous, polyphonic tracks. Each track may be assigned to one of 16 MIDI channels. Simultaneously plays up to 16 polyphonic synthesizers
- 3.5-inch floppy disk drive stores complex songs and holds over 110,000 notes per disk
- One or all tracks may be TRANSPOSED at the touch of a key
- Real-time ERASE function expedites editing
- REPEAT function automatically repeats any held notes at a pre-selected rhythmic value
- TIMING CORRECTION works during playback and operates without "chopping" notes
- Optional remote control

== Brochure (1985) ==
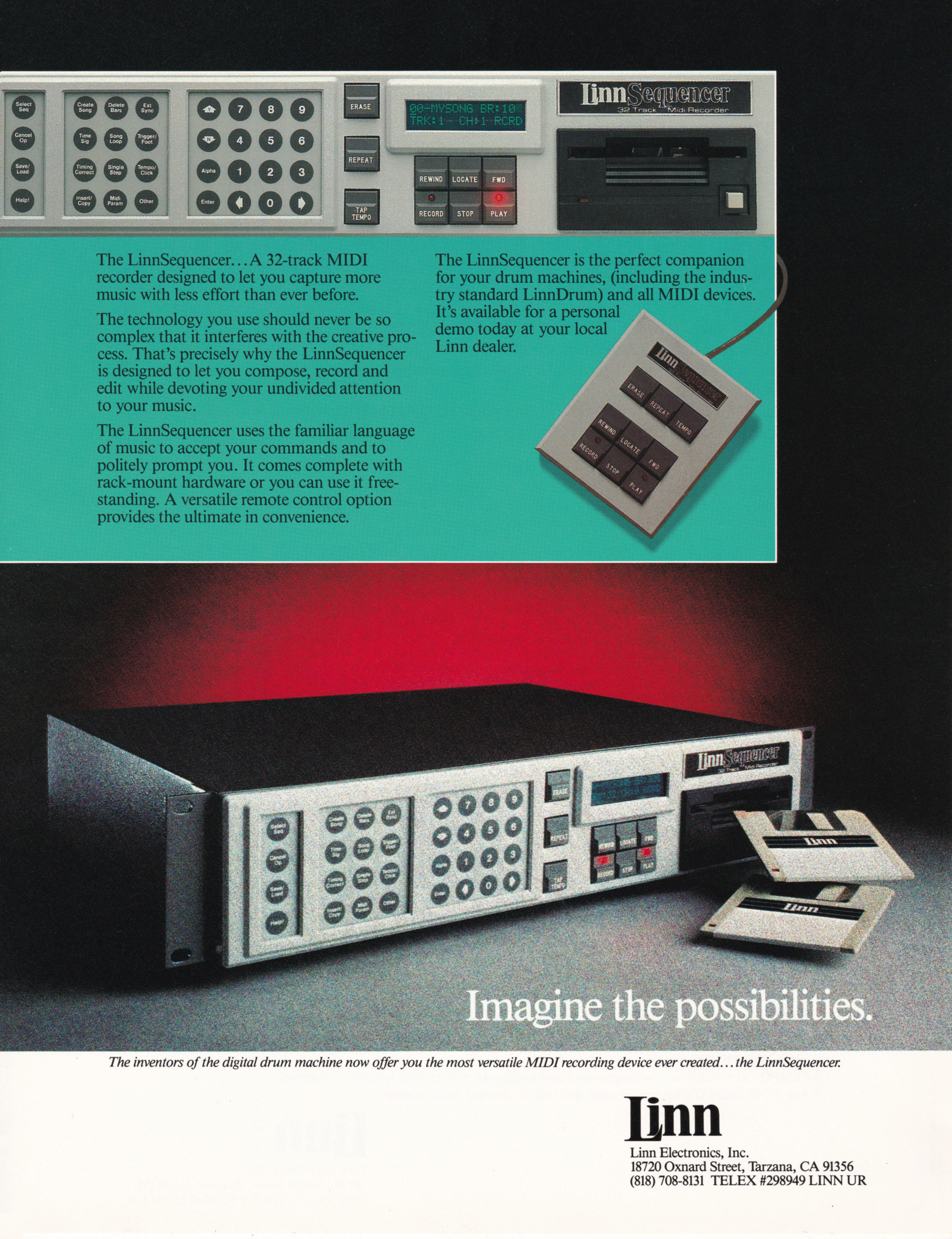
page 1

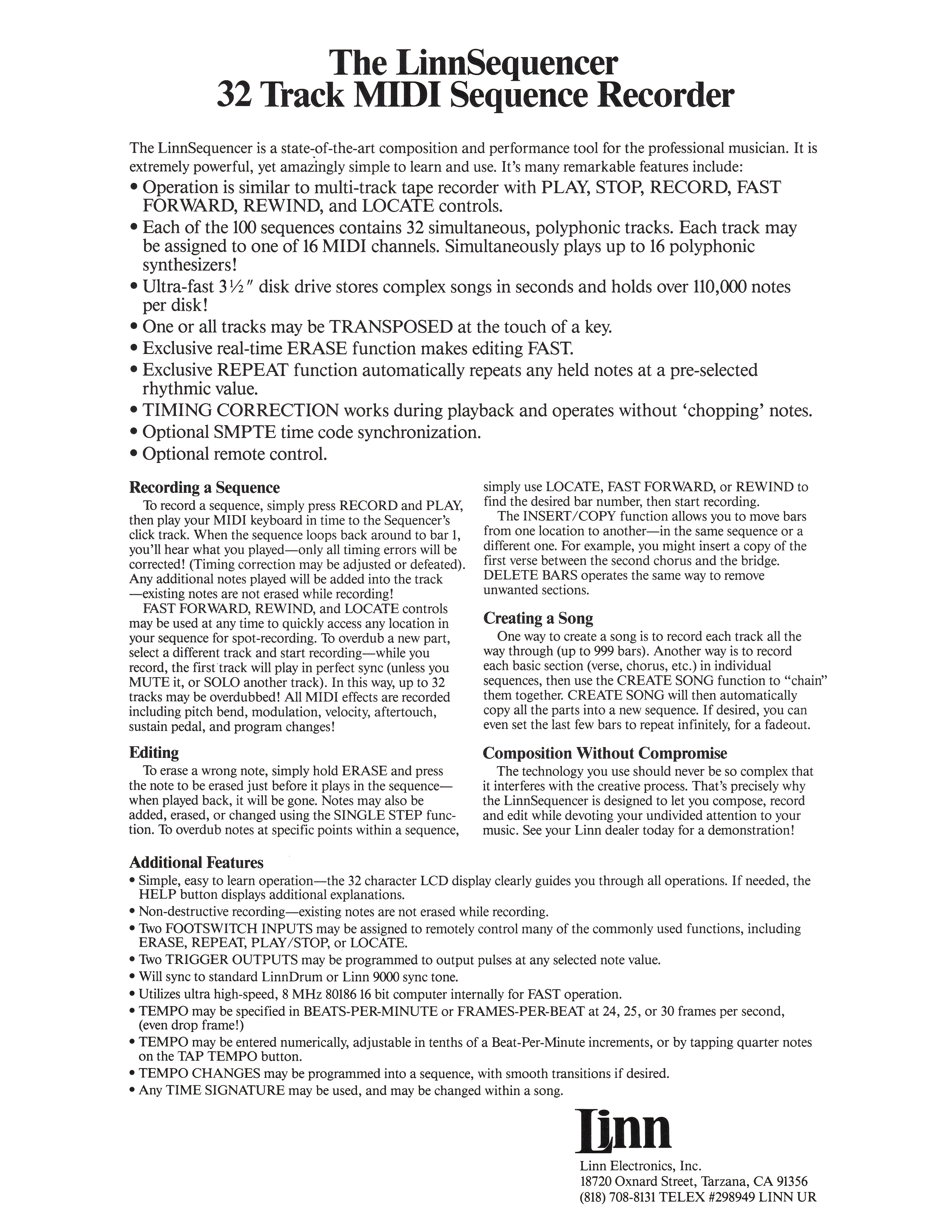
page 2
