= Roger Linn =

American engineer

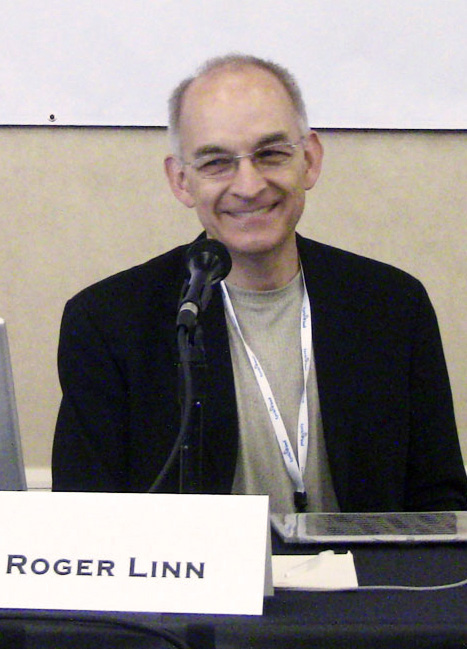
- Linn at MusicTech Summit, 2010
- Born: Roger Curtis Linn
- Occupation: Designer
- Spouse: Ingrid Linn
- Engineering career
- Discipline: Songwriting; Electronic engineering
- Projects: Linn Electronics
- Website: rogerlinndesign.com

Roger Curtis Linn is an American designer of electronic musical instruments and the co-founder of Linn Electronics. He is the designer of the LM-1 (the first drum machine to use samples), and its successor, the LinnDrum, which were both used extensively in 1980s pop music. Later in the decade, he created the MPC sampler, which had a major impact on the development of hip-hop.

== Linn Electronics ==
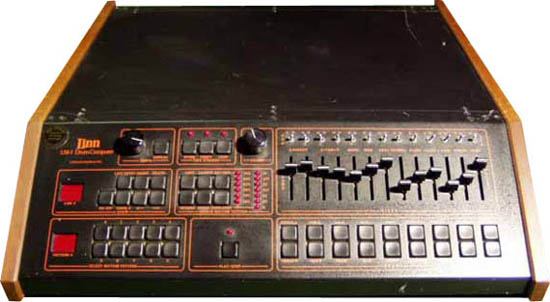
LM-1

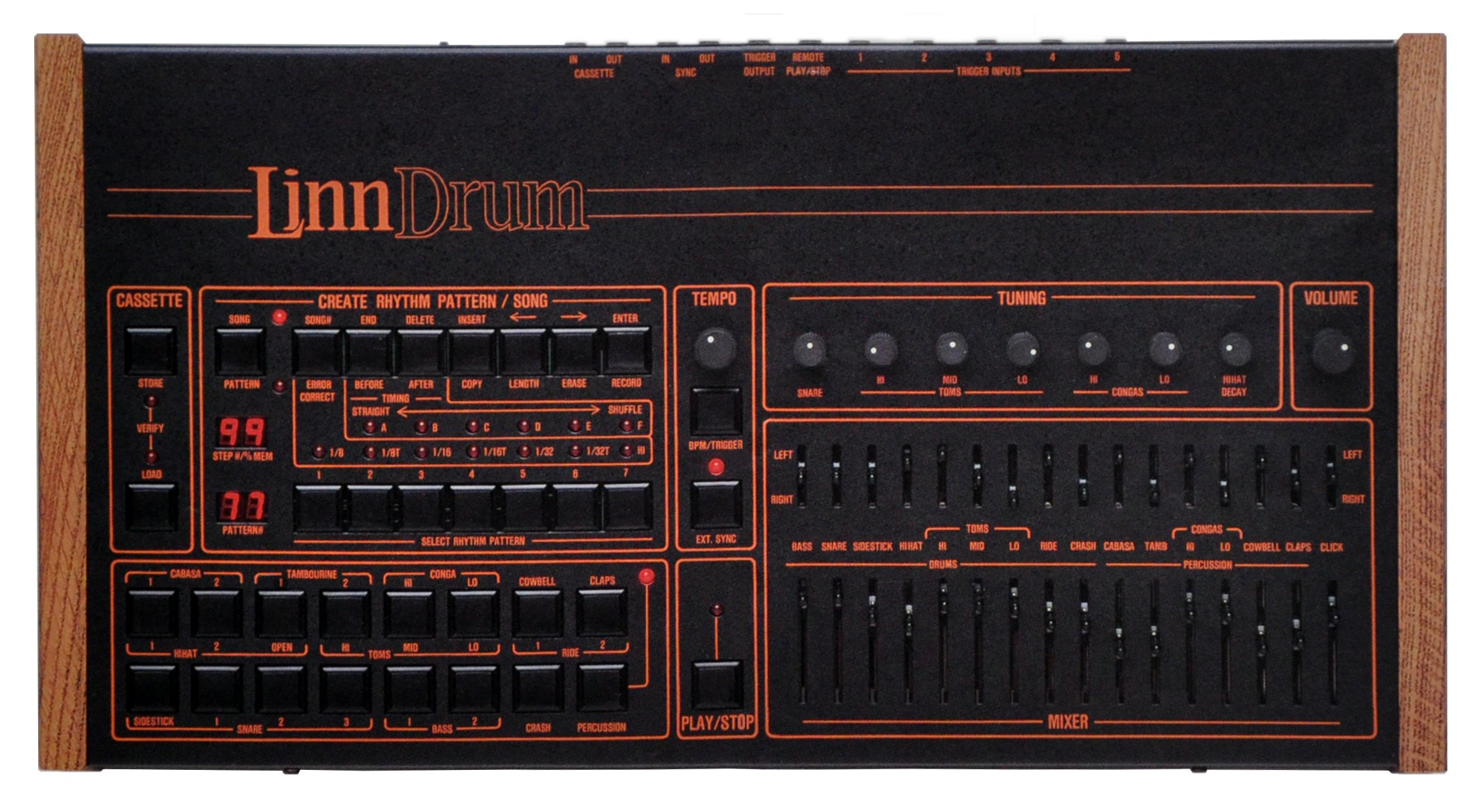
LinnDrum

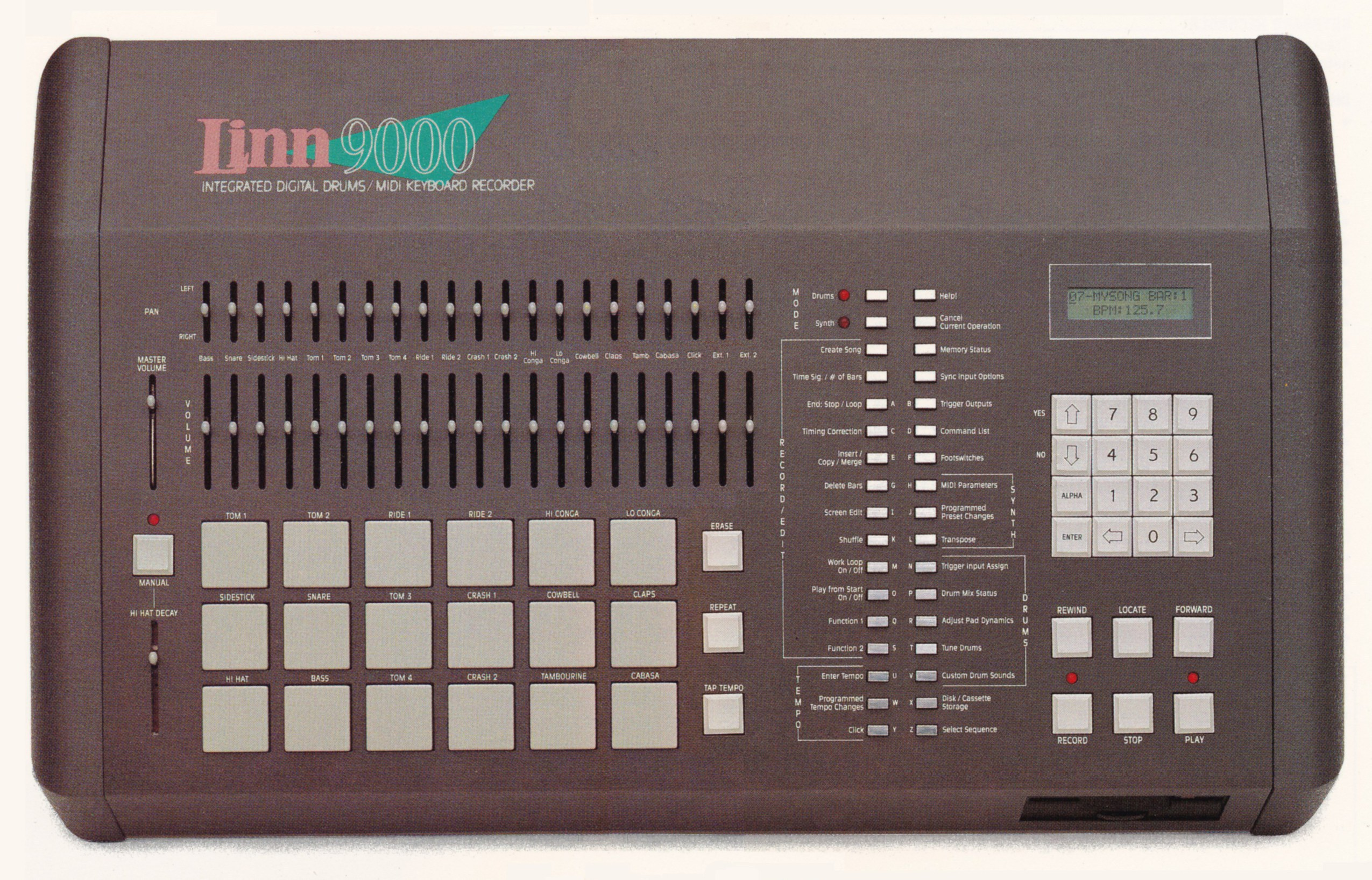
Linn 9000

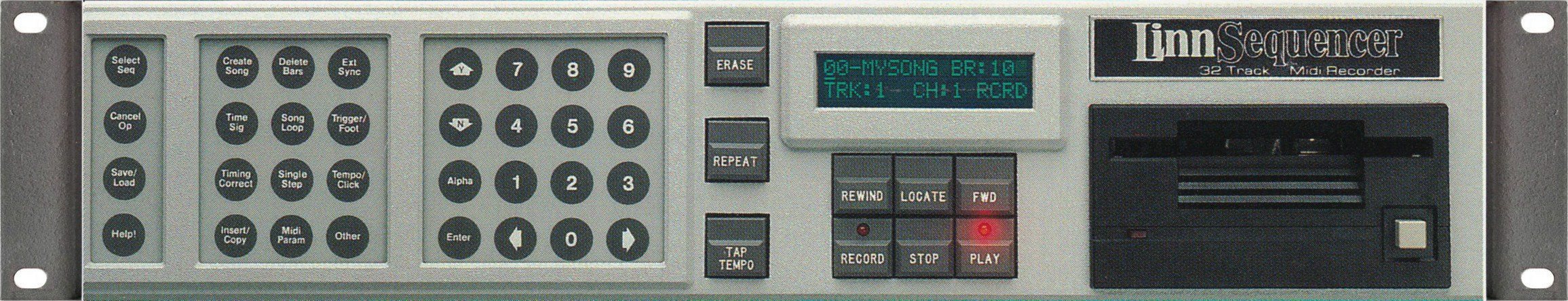
LinnSequencer

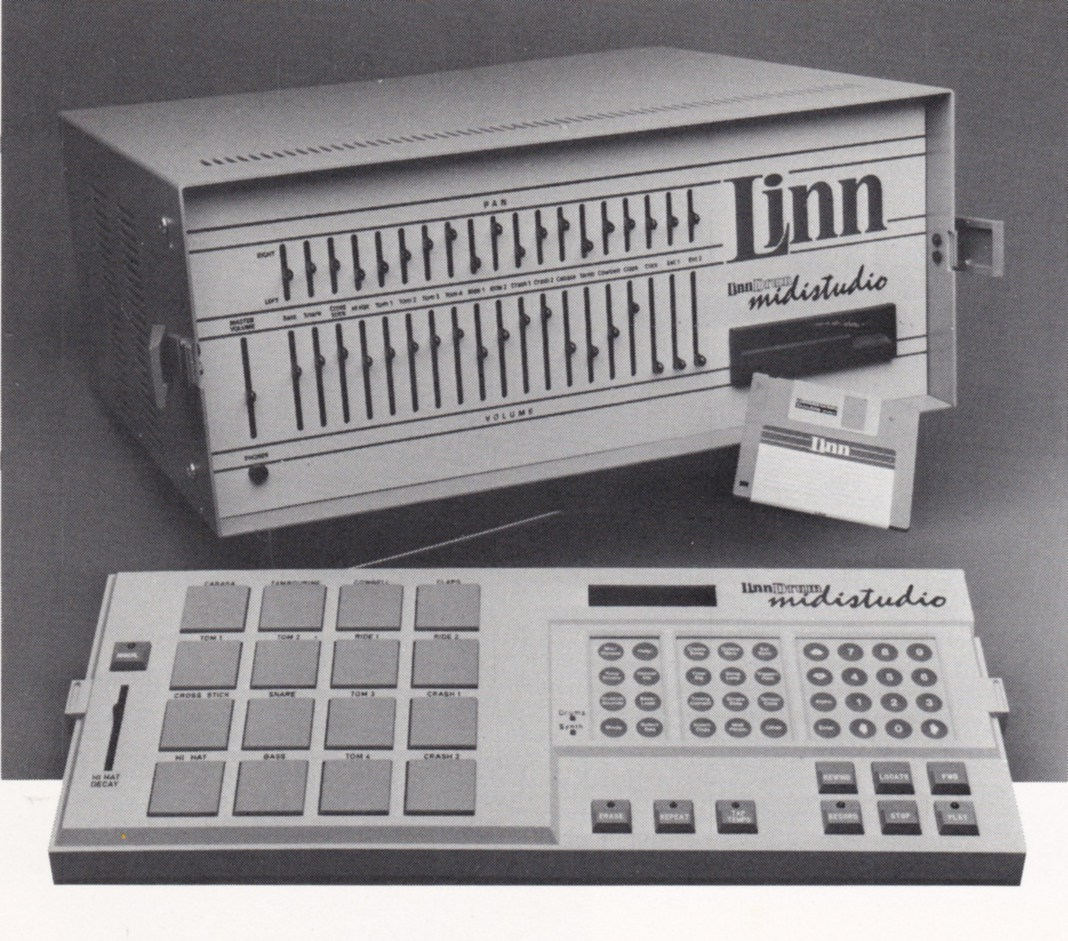
LinnDrum Midistudio

In 1979, Roger Linn and Alex Moffett founded Linn Moffett Electronics, soon renamed Linn Electronics, to develop Linn's design for a drum machine that used samples. It was named LM-1 for Linn/Moffett/1. Moffett left the company in 1982. Linn used his new drum machine and performed with Leon Russell on his album Life and Love in 1979.

=== LM-1 ===
In 1980, Roger Linn released the LM-1 Drum Computer. It was one of the first programmable drum machines and the first to use samples of acoustic drums. Linn wanted a machine that would produce more realistic sounds and offer more than preset patterns. The LM-1 became a staple of 1980s pop music and helped establish drum machines as credible tools. It appeared on records by artists including the Human League, Gary Numan, Mecano, Icehouse, Michael Jackson, Queen, Tears For Fears and particularly Prince.

=== LinnDrum ===
In 1982, Linn released the cheaper and more stable LinnDrum, which was a commercial success. It was cheaper and more widely produced than his first drum machine, the Linn LM-1,. It was used by artists and producers including Trevor Horn, Mark Knopfler, Naked Eyes, Stock Aitken Waterman, Sandy Vee and Justin Hayward.

=== Linn 9000 ===
In 1984 Linn released the Linn 9000 as the successor to the LinnDrum. It was the first integrated digital drum machine and MIDI sequencer. The 9000 had innovative features, like dynamic sensitive rubber pads, and would influence many future drum machine designs. But chronic software bugs led to a reputation for unreliability and contributed to the eventual demise of the company. The 9000 can be heard on Michael Jackson's 1987 album, Bad, on the cuts such as "Bad" and "Liberian Girl".

=== LinnSequencer ===
In 1985, Linn released the LinnSequencer, a rack mount 32 track hardware MIDI sequencer. It used the same flawed operating system used in the Linn 9000. As a result, the machine earned a reputation for unreliability.

=== LinnDrum Midistudio ===
In January 1986, Linn debuted the LinnDrum Midistudio at the NAMM Winter Music & Sound Market as the successor to the Linn 9000. The Midistudio is essentially a rack mount version of the Linn 9000 with some improvements. It used the same flawed operating system used in the Linn 9000. It never went into production because Linn Electronics went out of business the following month.

Similarities between the LinnDrum Midistudio and the Akai MPC series lead some to perceive a family resemblance. Most notably, the Midistudio has sixteen dynamic sensitive rubber pads in the distinctive four by four pattern that would become the hallmark of the MPCs, starting with the MPC60.

=== Legacy ===
Linn Electronics went out of business in February 1986. Forat Electronics purchased their remaining assets, manufactured and sold the Forat F9000 and LinnSequencer until 1994 and provide service, sounds, customization and upgrades for the entire Linn Electronics line.

The LM-1, LinnDrum and Linn 9000 became synonymous with the music of the 1980s. The Linn 9000 and LinnDrum Midistudio pioneered the concept of the Music Production Center or MPC.

== Akai MPC ==
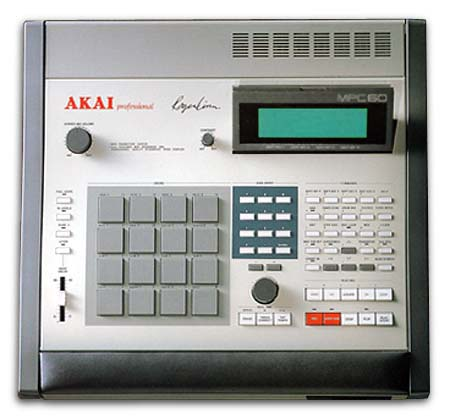
MPC60

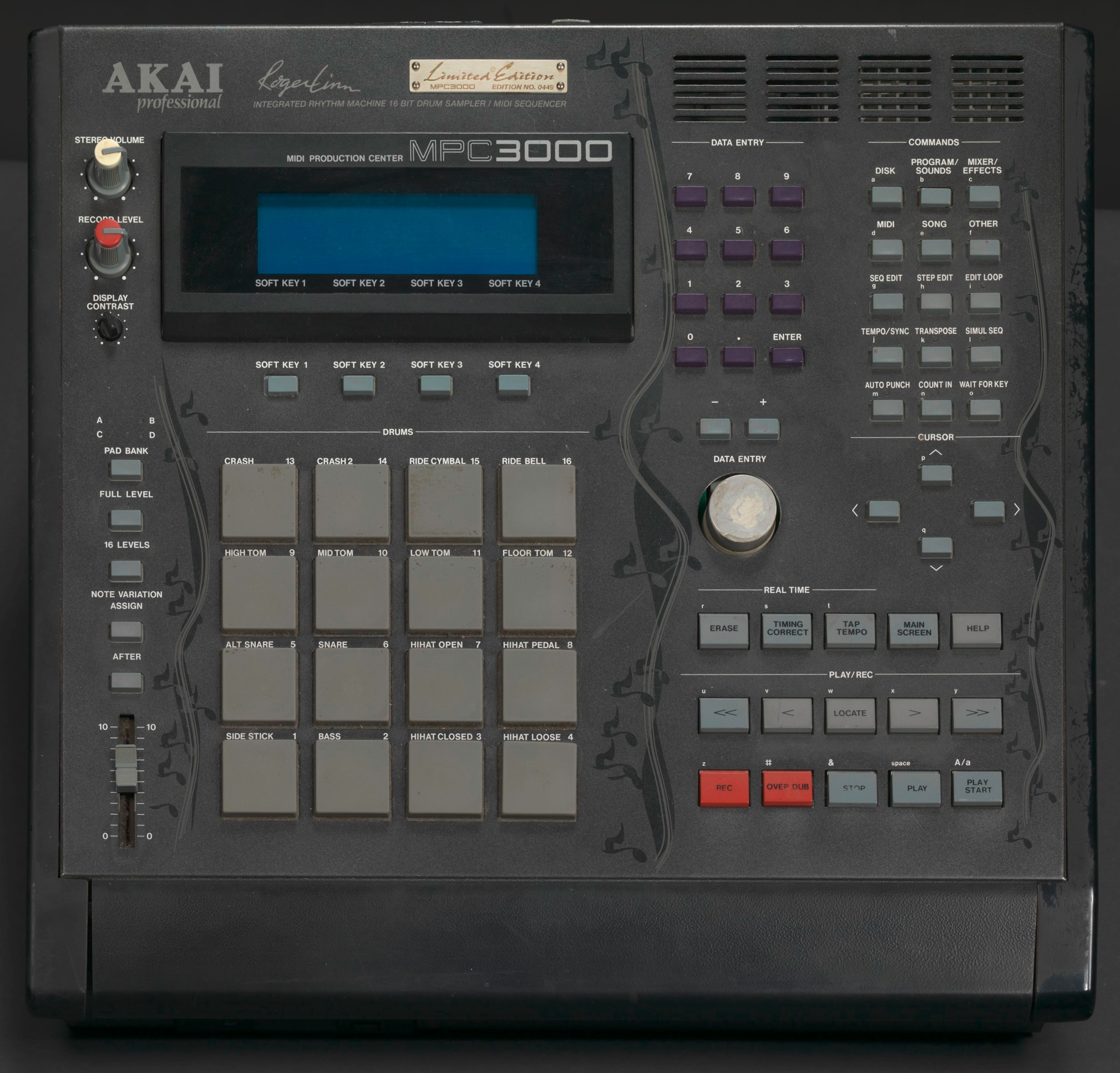
MPC3000

After Linn Electronics, Linn collaborated with the Japanese company Akai to design the MPC60, an integrated sampler, drum machine and MIDI sequencer released in 1988. According to Linn, "[The collaboration] was a good fit because Akai needed a creative designer with ideas and I didn't want to do sales, marketing, finance or manufacturing, all of which Akai was very good at." The MPC60 was followed by the MPC60 MkII and the MPC3000.

Linn aimed to design an affordable user-friendly instrument that did not require extensive musical knowledge or studio equipment to use. It had a major influence on the development of hip hop and electronic music. The 4x4 grid of pads was adopted by numerous manufacturers and became standard in DJ technology.

Linn left Akai after the company went out of business and its assets were purchased by Numark. According to Linn, the new organization was led by "a very unscrupulous fellow ... he immediately stopped my royalty payments, refused to take my calls and had his lawyer send me threatening letters. I checked around and learned that he has a reputation of being a real bastard, so given that challenging him would have been long and expensive, I let it go." Akai has continued to produce MPC models without Linn, such as the MPC2000; Linn was critical, saying: "Akai seems to be making slight changes to my old 1986 designs for the original MPC, basically rearranging the deck chairs on the Titanic."

== Roger Linn Design ==
In 2001 Roger Linn founded a new company, Roger Linn Design. The company's first product offering was the AdrenaLinn, with the LinnStrument music performance controller added later.

=== AdrenaLinn ===
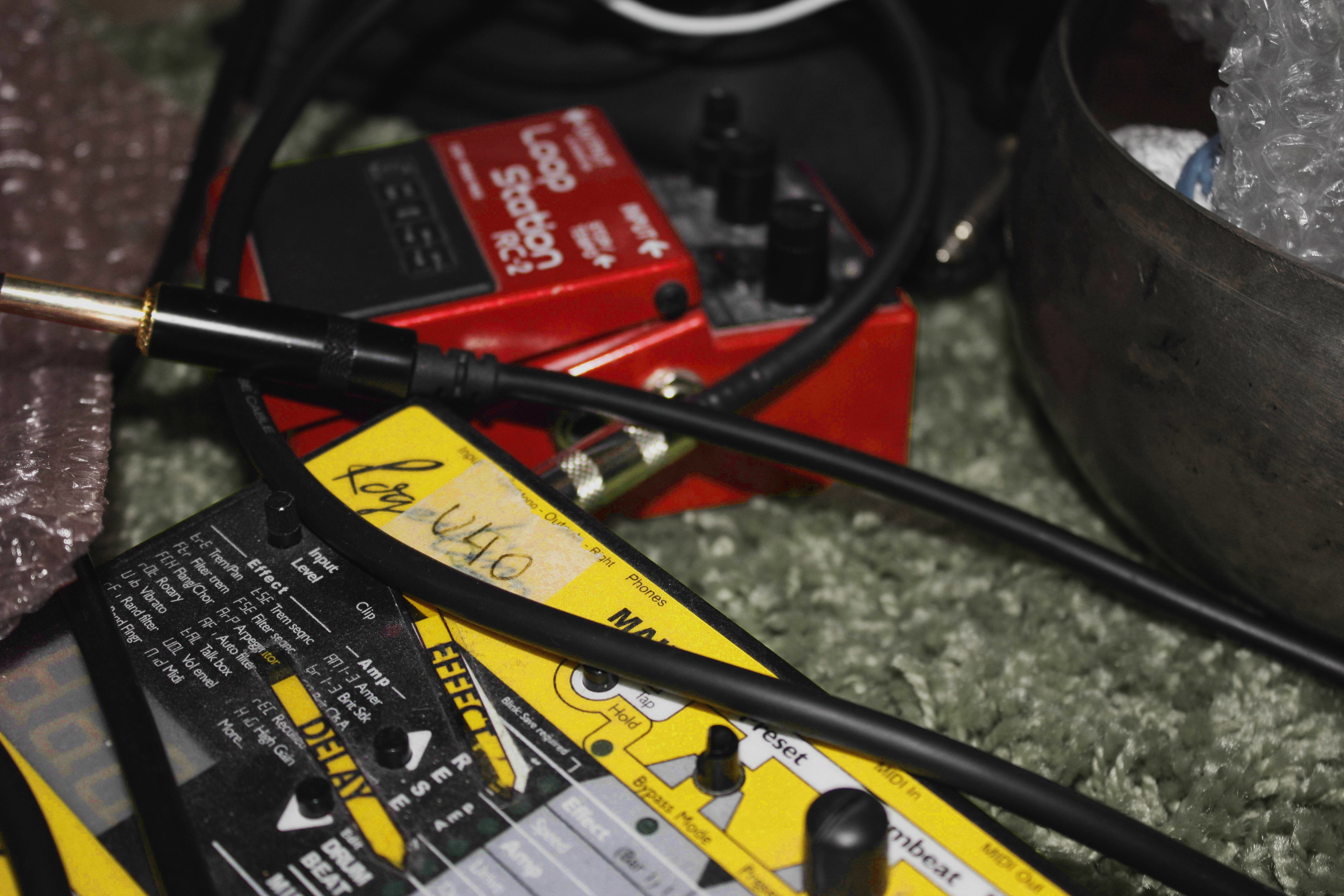
AdrenaLinn II (front)

The AdrenaLinn is a digital multi-effects unit with a drum machine and amp modeler all in one, designed by Roger Linn with some help from Dave Smith (credited with helping to conceive MIDI) and Tom Oberheim (designer of early analog synthesizers). Most notably, unlike other guitar pedals, the AdrenaLinn specializes in beat-synced effects, including modulation and delay but also a sequencer that provides looped patterns of filtered tones, all moving in sync to its internal drum machine or to midi. The drum section can also be affected by the filter section, allowing dance-style beats. Other unusual aspects of this pedal include note-triggered filter effects such as auto-wah, simulated talk box and guitar synthesizer sounds. The AdrenaLinn technology was also the basis of Roger Linn's partnership with M-Audio to create the Black Box guitar multi-effect and recording unit.

The AdrenaLinn can be heard on the following records (among many others):

- John Mayer – "Heartbreak Warfare", from the 2009 album Battle Studies, "Bigger than My Body" from the 2003 album Heavier Things and "I Don't Trust Myself (With Loving You)" from the 2006 album Continuum
- Green Day – "Boulevard of Broken Dreams" from the 2004 album American Idiot
- Red Hot Chili Peppers – By The Way – Warner Bros. – 2002 (produced by Rick Rubin)
- Gustavo Cerati – Siempre es hoy – BMG Ariola – 2002
- Morcheeba – Parts Of The Process – Reprise Records – 2003
- Marillion – Marbles – 2004

The AdrenaLinn was followed-up with the AdrenaLinn II and AdrenaLinn III.

=== LinnDrum II ===
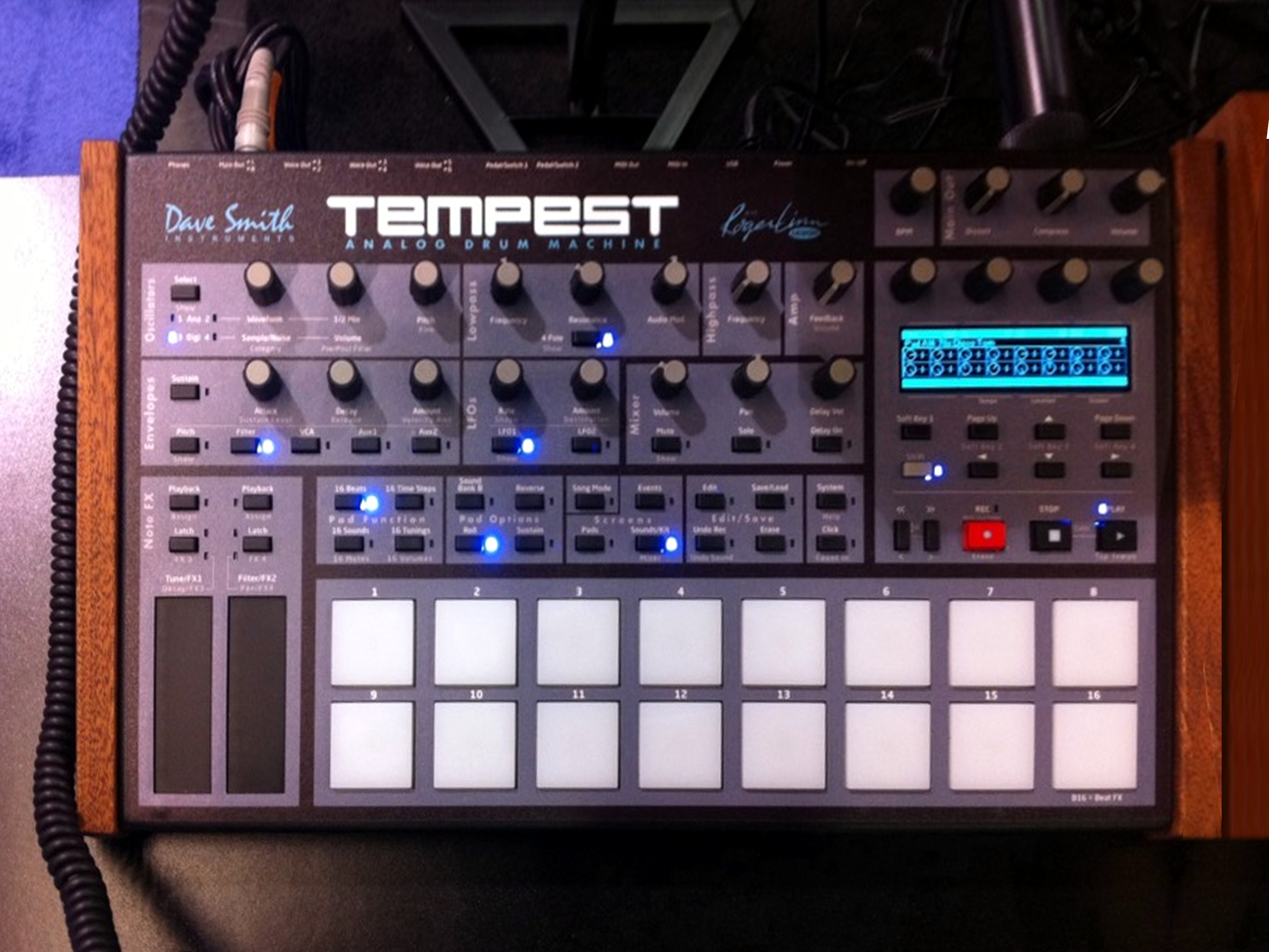
Tempest (2011)

Roger Linn and Dave Smith announced co-development of a drum machine product, originally to be called BoomChik, but changed to LinnDrum II in December 2007, a reference to one of Linn's early popular drum machines: the LinnDrum. The LinnDrum II was renamed the Tempest, and co-released by Roger Linn Designs and Dave Smith Instruments in 2011. Unlike Linn's previous digital drum machines, the Tempest was an analog drum machine.

=== LinnStrument ===
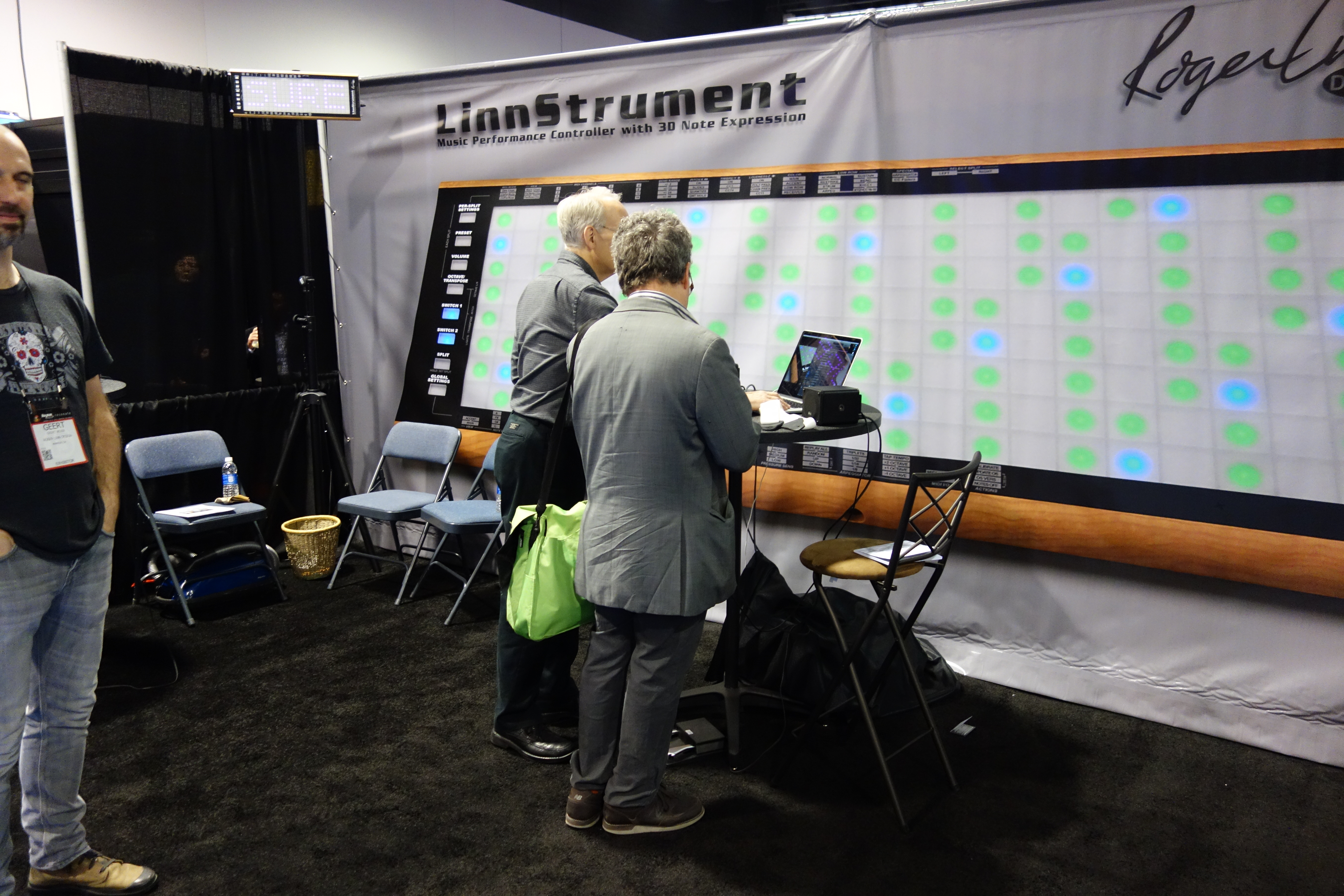
LinnStrument booth at Winter NAMM 2015

In late 2014, after several years of development, Linn released the LinnStrument, a music performance controller with 3D note expression. The grid based MIDI controller, playable with one or two hands, is velocity sensitive, but also senses three dimensions per finger, polyphonically. It can employ MPE, thereby using a full MIDI channel per note. Two versions are available, the larger original LinnStrument as well as the smaller LinnStrument 128.

Almost the entire surface of the controller is covered by its 8 by 25 (or 8 by 16 in the case of the LinnStrument 128) grid. The fingertip-sized fields are each able to measure and transmit velocity, aftertouch, x-position relative to the entire row (or any subset thereof), y-position within a field, as well as release velocity. It is highly adaptable and can also function in more traditional MIDI configurations, accommodating sound generators that don't yet support MPE and allowing them to be played more expressively.

The LinnStrument has several additional features, such as an arpeggiator, a velocity-sensitive step sequencer as well as freely assignable virtual MIDI faders. It is USB-powered and can communicate via USB or 5-pin MIDI.

== Music career ==
Roger Linn has had a level of songwriting success, penning hits ("Promises", Eric Clapton 1979; "Quittin' Time", Lou Ann Barton 1986, Mary Chapin Carpenter 1991, Amy Bishop 2009), and having toured as a guitarist with the pianist and songwriter Leon Russell in the 1970s at age 21.

In 2011 Roger was awarded a Grammy Award for Lifetime Technical Achievement, recognizing his many contributions to the music recording industry.
