= Electronic drum module =

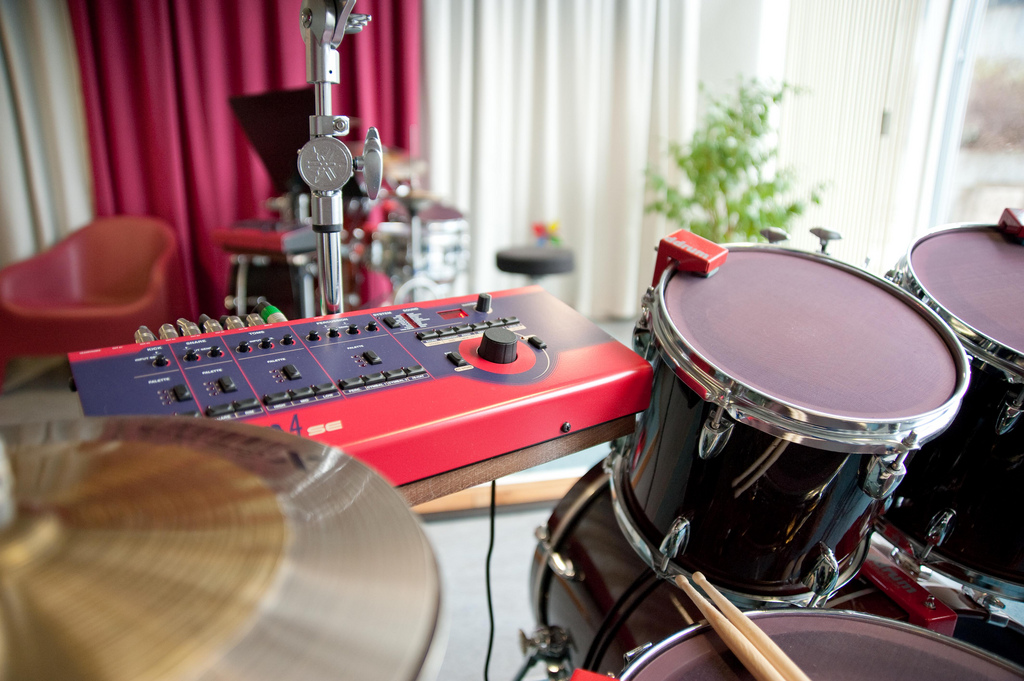
A Clavia ddrum4 sound module, pictured in use with an acoustic drum kit with electronic "triggers" or sensors.

An electronic drum module is an electronic or digital music device in an electronic drum kit that serves as the central processing unit and sound module. The drum module creates or produces the drum kit sounds or other sounds selected by the drummer. By itself, a drum module cannot play or sound drum beats. It only produces drum sounds when a performer strikes electronic drum pads or acoustic drum kit instruments that have electronic "triggers" (or sensors) attached to them. When the electronic drum pads or trigger-equipped instruments are struck, this sends a signal to the drum module, which produces the corresponding electronic drum sound (or other sound). Even when drum pads and/or triggers are connected to a drum module, the drum module by itself does not make any audible sound. Like other electronic instruments such as the synthesizer, the drum module only outputs an electronic signal. The performer can hear this signal by connecting headphones to the drum module (i.e., for individual practice) or by plugging the drum module into an amplifier and loudspeaker or PA system for audible practice or live performances. The drum module's output signal can also be patched into an audio console for concerts or sound recording. The nomenclature varies (see below). For example, electronic drum modules are called "percussion sound modules" in the case of Roland Corporation, or sometimes simply modules. A common colloquial term for this device is drum brain. (see below).

Electronic drum modules are included with most complete electronic drum kits (which include a drum module and a set of drum pads). Electronic drum modules can also be purchased as stand-alone units. In this case, the performer must also purchase drum pads and/or triggers which she can attach to regular acoustic drums. An electronic drum module is a special-purpose electronic device which accepts input from the drummer via external triggers that are hit with regular drum sticks. With an electronic drum kit, the player hits triggering devices as a synthesizer player would strike the keys of the synthesizer keyboard. Triggers may be pads or cymbal-shaped devices or piezo-electric pick-ups similar in function to a guitar pick-up. When the triggers are struck or activated by the vibration of a drum or other instrument, the electronic drum module interprets the signal and outputs the specific voice assigned to that trigger. The sound (or "voice") may be a sample or synthesized reproduction of any of a wide variety of drum, cymbal, percussion or other instruments, or even vocal sounds. It is similar in concept to modern MIDI musical keyboard workstations or synthesizers especially in that any sound available within a given module can be assigned to any trigger plugged into the module.

Most electronic drum modules come with a number of pre-programmed "kits" or "sets" - collections of drum kit voices assigned to specific triggers which emulate a traditional drum set (e.g., including drum and cymbal sounds). Many modules allow the player to save their own collections of sounds as additional kits and allow the player to recall them as desired. In effect, a single set of triggers may serve the same function as several traditional drum sets or collections of miscellaneous percussion instruments. Some modules may allow kits to be saved with labels such as: "rock kit", "jazz kit", and "hip-hop kit." Others simply assign a number to each saved kit. Modules may allow varying degrees of control over individual sounds such as the relative volume of each trigger input or add electronic effects such as reverb or other effects.

Most manufacturers also include more eclectic sounds in their modules, such as sounds from well-known drum machines, plus a large variety of ethnic percussion instruments, industrial music sounds, handclaps, and general percussion instruments or even vocal sounds. Manufacturers of electronic drum modules such as Roland Corporation have often built unusual playable sounds into the sound banks of their electronic drum modules to showcase the capabilities of the technology. Electronic drum modules also provide advanced features such as the ability to drive digital samplers. When used in conjunction with an electronic or digital sampler, the sounds that can be played with a drum module are practically unlimited. A drum module could be used to make any type of musical or natural sounds, from a piano or violin to ocean waves or other sound effects.

== Nomenclature ==
=== "Drum Brain" ===
While manufacturers such as Roland use "Percussion Sound Module," such a term only describes a subset of the device's functions. "Drum brain" is a term used by drummers, equipment sellers, and other industry professionals to be more descriptive. The term "drum brain" is used to denote the fact that its primary function is to act as the central logic device within an electronic drum kit.

=== Electronic drum modules vs. "drum machines" ===
Furthermore, an electronic drum module is not to be confused with a drum machine, which is an earlier innovation. Similar to electronic drum modules, drum machines reproduce drum sounds and programmable sequences of drum patterns. However, they are essentially limited to this purpose. "Drum machines" were introduced in the 1980s as an accompaniment device, essentially, an "artificial drummer". In contrast, an electronic drum module is designed to be an integral part of an electronic drum kit—an interactively playable device, played (usually live) by an actual drummer as part of his or her electronic drum kit.

=== Electronic drum modules vs "sound modules" ===
Technically speaking, an electronic drum module typically contains its own "sound module". Although Roland refers to their electronic drum modules as "percussion sound modules", the term sound module is misleading in this context. In its purest sense, a sound module is a device that merely contains its own unique variety of sounds. The electronic drum module referred to in this article may be considered to contain a sound module; however the distinction of an electronic drum module is that it contains the logic circuits to serve specifically as a conversion device: its first goal is to "read" drum play, its second task is to convert that "play" into audible sounds. It may be considered a combination of two components: an analog-to-digital converter, which converts the drum play (analog) into digital signals, with the latter task alone being the domain of a true "sound module".

== Examples ==
- Roland V-Drum drum brain modules
- Forat F16 16 bit digital sampler drum brain
- ION iDM01 drum brain
