= Forat F16 =

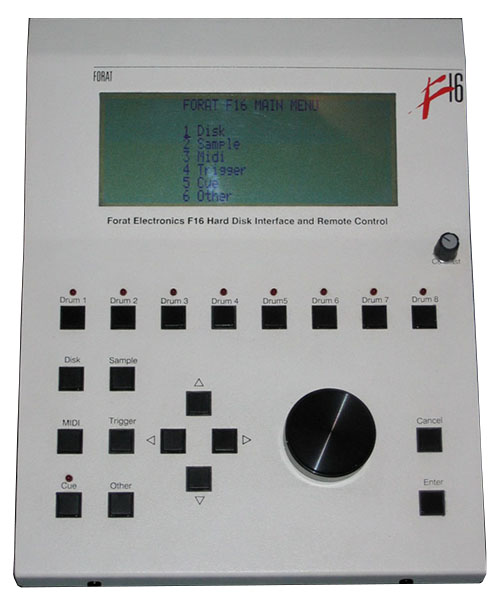
Remote Control

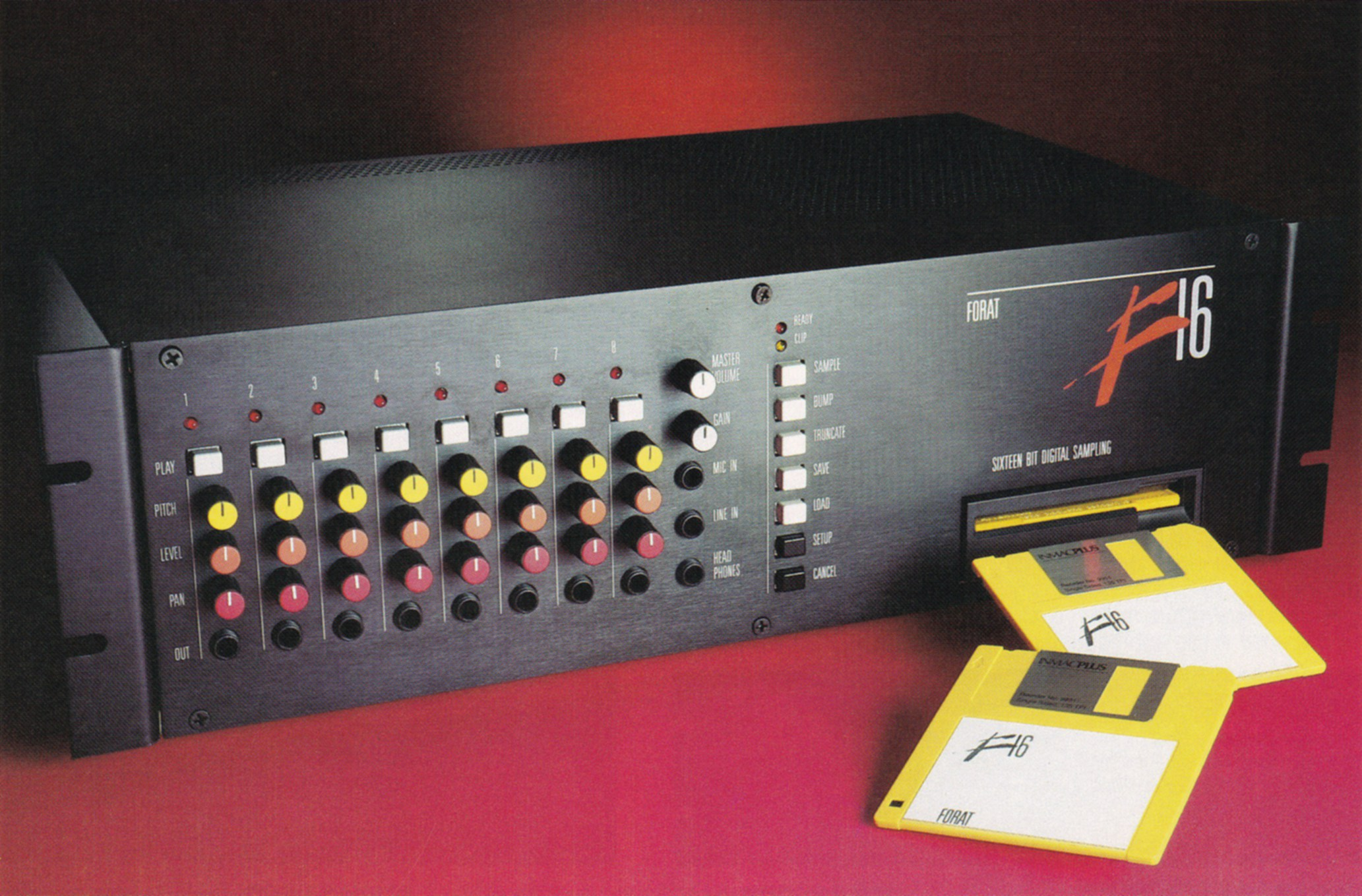
Forat F16 - 16 bit Digital Sampler / Drum Brain

The Forat F16 is the first 16 bit digital sampler optimized for use as an electronic drum module. It dynamically responds to trigger inputs from MIDI and/or audio signals. With a response time of 0.1 milliseconds, the F16 is the fastest audio triggering digital sampler ever sold. It was manufactured by Forat Music and Electronics, introduced in 1987 at a list price of $5200 and was discontinued in 1994. An optional Remote Control and SCSI capability was available for $1385.

== Features ==
The F16 Digital Sampler is a high-quality rack mount audio sampling and storage device designed to reproduce 16-bit sounds in response to MIDI or audio trigger inputs. Samples are recorded in full 16-bit linear format with 96 dB of dynamic range and superb signal to noise ratios.

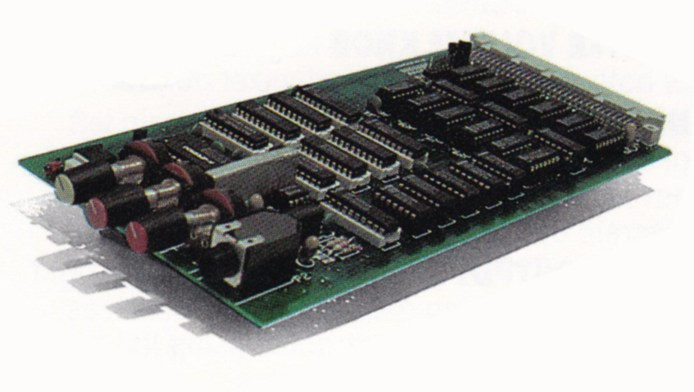
Voice Module Board

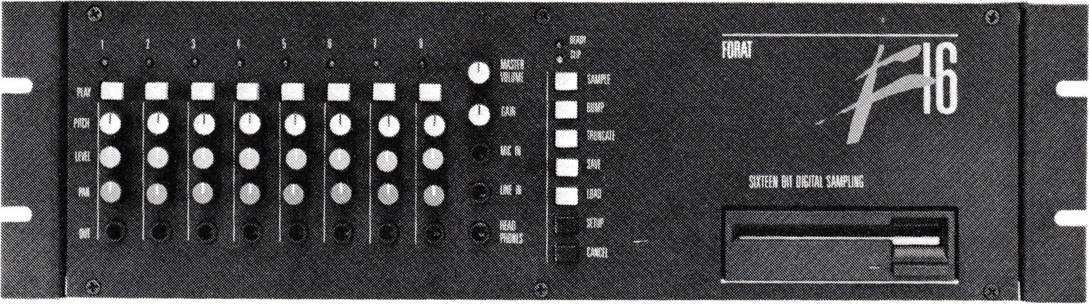
Front Panel

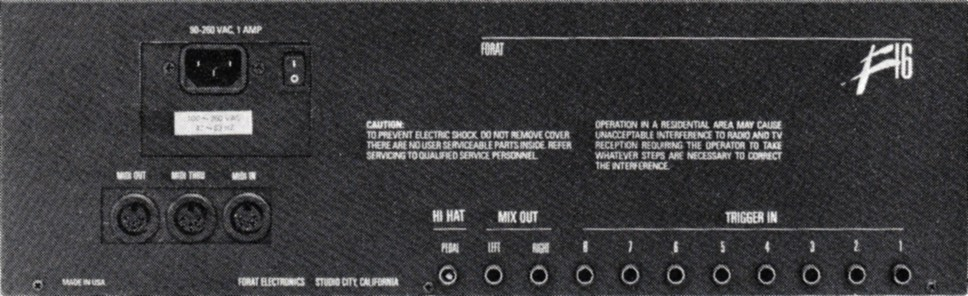
Back Panel

The unit consists of eight voice modules.

Each module is capable of storing a sample up to 26 seconds. The combined total maximum sampling time with eight modules is three minutes and thirty seconds. Sample rates range from 10 kHz to 60 kHz. High fidelity is achieved at 35 kHz and above, resulting in full bandwidth sounds of over seven seconds per voice module; one minute for all eight modules. In addition to recording individual samples, the modules may be "chained" to form one recording almost seven minutes long. Editing commands allow you to trim and move samples.

Each voice module has its own volume, pan and pitch controls and an activity light which indicates when the module is playing. Voices are available as discrete outputs, or in a composite stereo mix. The mix output only contains voices not extracted using the discrete outputs. The discrete outputs may also be used as an effects send and return to add reverb or other processing to individual voices prior to the stereo mix.

Each module has a dynamic velocity sensitive trigger input. The trigger response time is 0.1 milliseconds, providing an amazing range of sensitivity with absolute repeatability. The trigger inputs accommodate virtually all dynamic sensitive pads, drum machines, sequencer trigger outputs, plus audio from tape machines and other audio sources.

An optional Hi-Hat Module provides variable hi-hat decay controlled via MIDI or a foot pedal. This feature is similar to the programmable hi-hat decay on the Linn 9000 drum machine.

Sounds are saved to or loaded from an optional internal SCSI Zip drive, an external SCSI hard drive or a fast 600 RPM floppy drive.

MIDI In, Out, and Thru are supplied with full dynamic velocity sensitivity. Each module may be assigned to any MIDI note number and independent channel, and several modules may have the same note number and channel, if desired. MIDI note and channel settings are preserved when the F16 is turned off or unplugged.

The F16 features mic and line level inputs for sampling and a headphone jack.

A Remote Control plus SCSI capability was sold separately. 16-bit samples were sold separately.

== Brochure (1987) ==
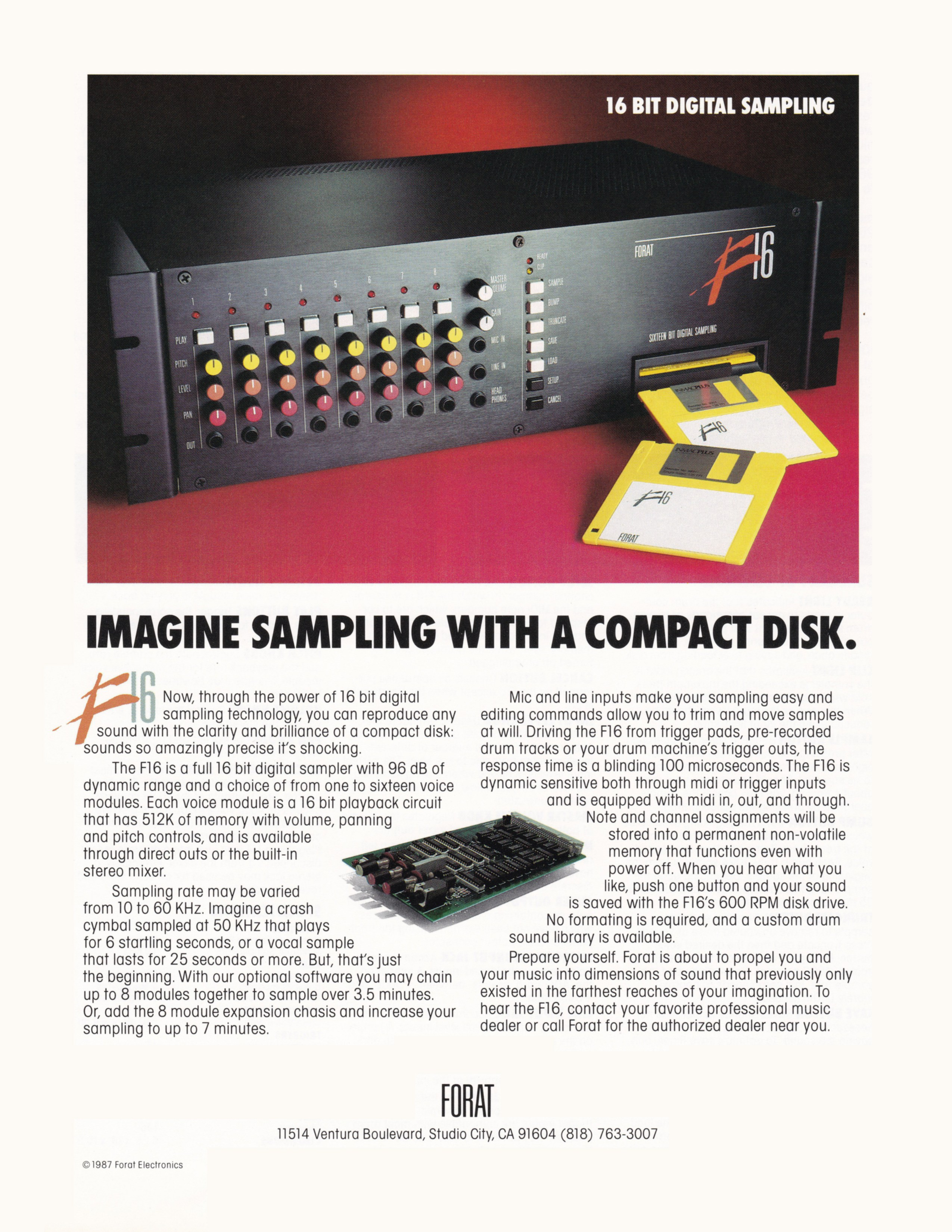
page 1

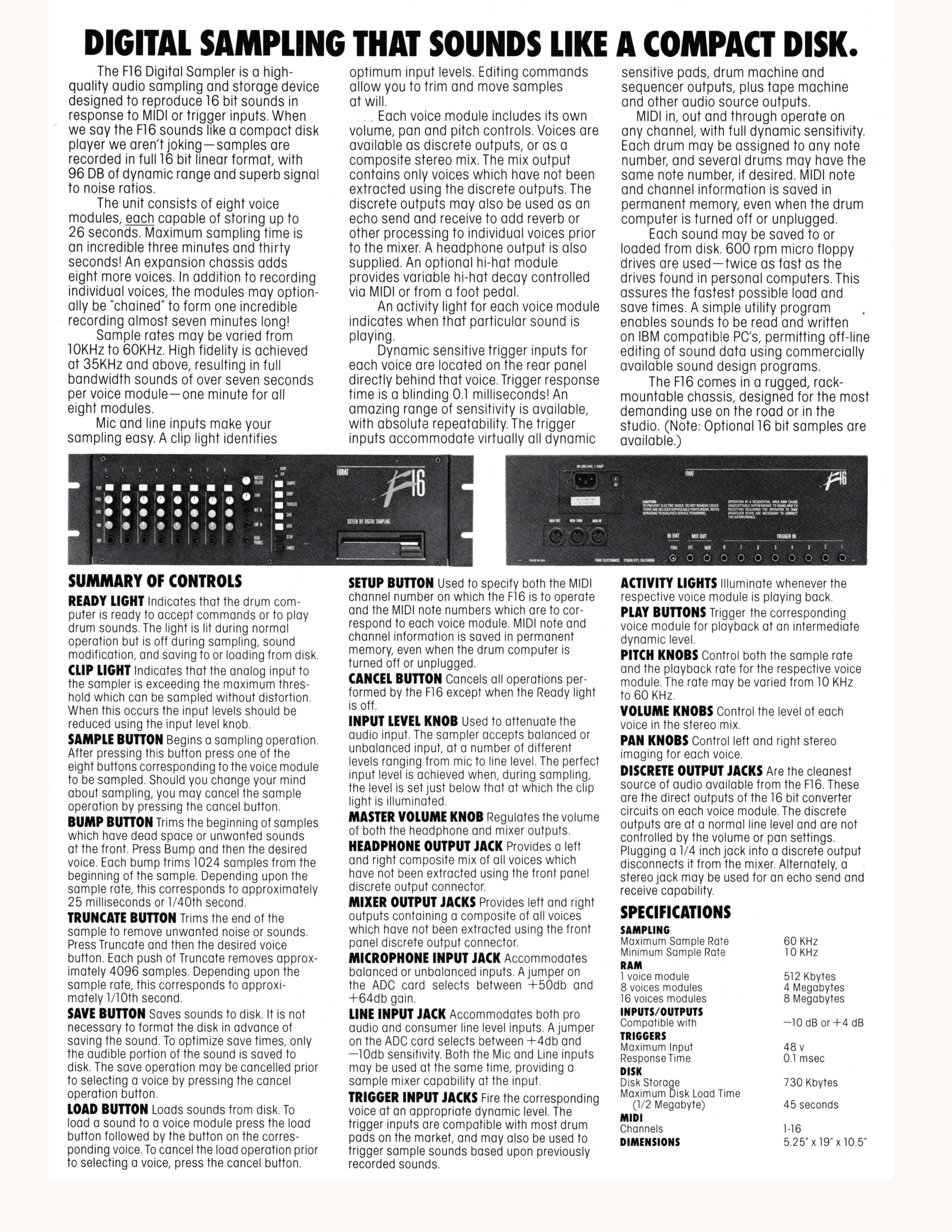
page 2

== Specifications ==
- Sample Rate: 10 kHz - 60 kHz
- Dynamic range: 96 dB
- Signal to Noise Ratio: "superb"
- Trigger Response Time: 0.1 milliseconds
- Trigger Maximum Input: 48 v
- RAM: 1 Voice Module: 512 kilobytes - 8 Voice Modules: 4 megabytes total
- Maximum Sample Time: 26 seconds per module
- Audio Inputs/Outputs: Compatible with -10 dB or +4 dB
- Disk Storage: Internal 100MB ZIP Drive
- MIDI: In/Out/Thru - 16 Channels
- Dimensions: 5.25" x 19" x 10.5" - 3 rack spaces

== Notable Users ==
Many top artists, producers, engineers and drummers have used the F16 including:

- Bryan Adams
- Rick Allen
- Kenneth "Babyface" Edmonds
- Def Leppard
- Jimmy Jam and Terry Lewis
- L.A. Reid
- Mike Shipley
- Alan Moulder
- Ron Nevison
- Dave "Hard Drive" Pensado
- John “JR” Robinson
- Rod Stewart
- Damon Thomas

Grammy Award-winning mix engineer, Dave "Hard Drive" Pensado says "the Forat F16 is my little secret weapon."

When Alan Moulder (Nine Inch Nails) was asked: "Is there a piece of equipment you can't do without?" he replied: "I've got a Forat F16 that I use to trigger kicks and snares".
