= Forat F9000 =

Drum machine

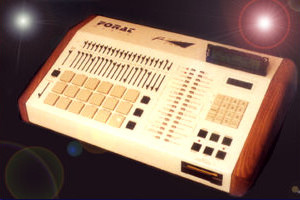
- Forat F9000 integrated digital drum machine and MIDI keyboard recorder.
- Manufacturer: Forat Electronics
- Dates: 1987-1994
- Price: US $5,000 (fully expanded)

Technical specifications
- Polyphony: polyphonic 13 voices
- Timbrality: multitimbral 18 voices
- Synthesis type: 8 bit Digital Samples / 11 kHz - 37kHz
- Storage memory: 100 Drum Sequences, 100 MIDI Sequences - 43,538 notes
- Effects: Individual level, pan, tuning for all sounds

Input/output
- Keyboard: 18 large (1.25 inch square) velocity and pressure sensitive rubber pads
- External control: MIDI In/Out/Thru, Foot Switch x2, Foot Controller x1 (hi-hat), Sync Tone In/Out, trigger outputs x2, trigger inputs x6

The Forat F9000 (also known as the Forat 9000 or F9000) is a software- and hardware-upgraded version of the ill-fated Linn 9000, an integrated digital sampling drum machine and hardware MIDI sequencer manufactured by Linn Electronics and released in 1984 at a list price of $5,000 ($7,000 fully expanded).

The Linn 9000 was plagued by chronic software bugs and a reputation for unreliability, which contributed to the eventual demise of Linn Electronics in February 1986.

After they went out of business, Forat Electronics purchased all of Linn's remaining assets. Forat rewrote the Linn 9000 operating system, fixed bugs and added many new hardware and software features. Dubbed the Forat F9000, it was the first fully functional integrated sampling, sequencing and MIDI workstation.

The Forat F9000 was released in 1987 by Forat Electronics at a list price of $5,000 (fully expanded). The F9000 was manufactured and sold as a new complete unit. Forat discontinued manufacturing new complete F9000s in 1994. However, as of 2016, Forat still offers the F9000 software and hardware upgrades to existing Linn 9000s. The latest version of the F9000 operating system is 7.09.

== Features ==
In addition to retaining all the original features of the Linn 9000, bug free, the F9000 added many new features including:

- Up to 18 custom sounds (on the Linn 9000, the maximum was 4)
- Four times the sequencer memory of the Linn 9000
- Full SMPTE read/write sync (promised, but not released by Linn Electronics)
- MIDI Clock
- MIDI Song Position Pointer
- Sample editing - sounds can be truncated, faded or reversed
- Total sample time increased to 33 seconds
- A larger LCD divided into two parts for drums and sequencer
- Sequencer tracks can be copied, duplicated, shifted, re-quantized and merged
- Sequencer records all 32 MIDI controllers and System Exclusive data
- 156 steps of drum tuning could be recorded dynamically
- Tunings can be spread across all 18 pads with each pad user tunable
- Battery-backed memory - sounds and sequences are retained when powered off
- Drum Solo and Mute functions
- Faster erasing and faster auditioning of sounds
- Microscope Sequence editing with Event and Global Modes. Step through events and change MIDI note value, velocity and duration via the up/down buttons or simply play the desired note on a MIDI keyboard. Spot erase any note. This process can be done on one or all tracks simultaneously. In Global Mode, you can transpose, erase or scale velocities and duration of notes. You can also specify a range of notes on which these Global edits occur.
- Drum Section Global and Event editing. Specify a range of drum tuning, velocity, and hi-hat decays to be modified.
- Reassign MIDI drum notes, create a MIDI drum mix, and send MIDI automation data.
- Manual or programmable record punch in/out
- Under the Environment File, you can save all user set variables such as: SONG LIST, SMPTE START, and frame rates, pad dynamics, tempo, drum mix and tunings, as well as dozens of other settings.

== Linn 9000 Brochure (1984) ==
The Forat F9000 retains all the original Linn 9000 features so this Linn brochure from 1984 is just as pertinent to the F9000.

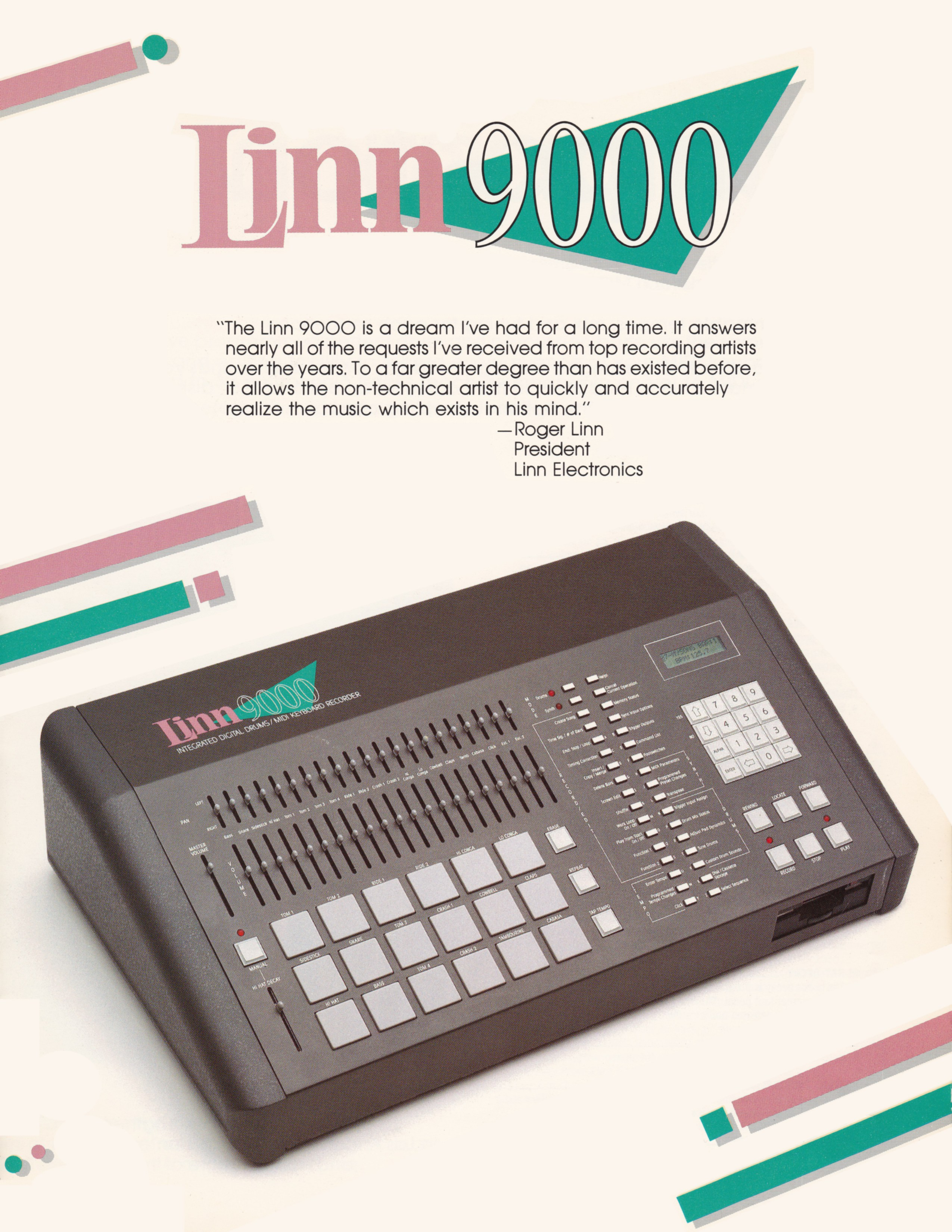
page 1

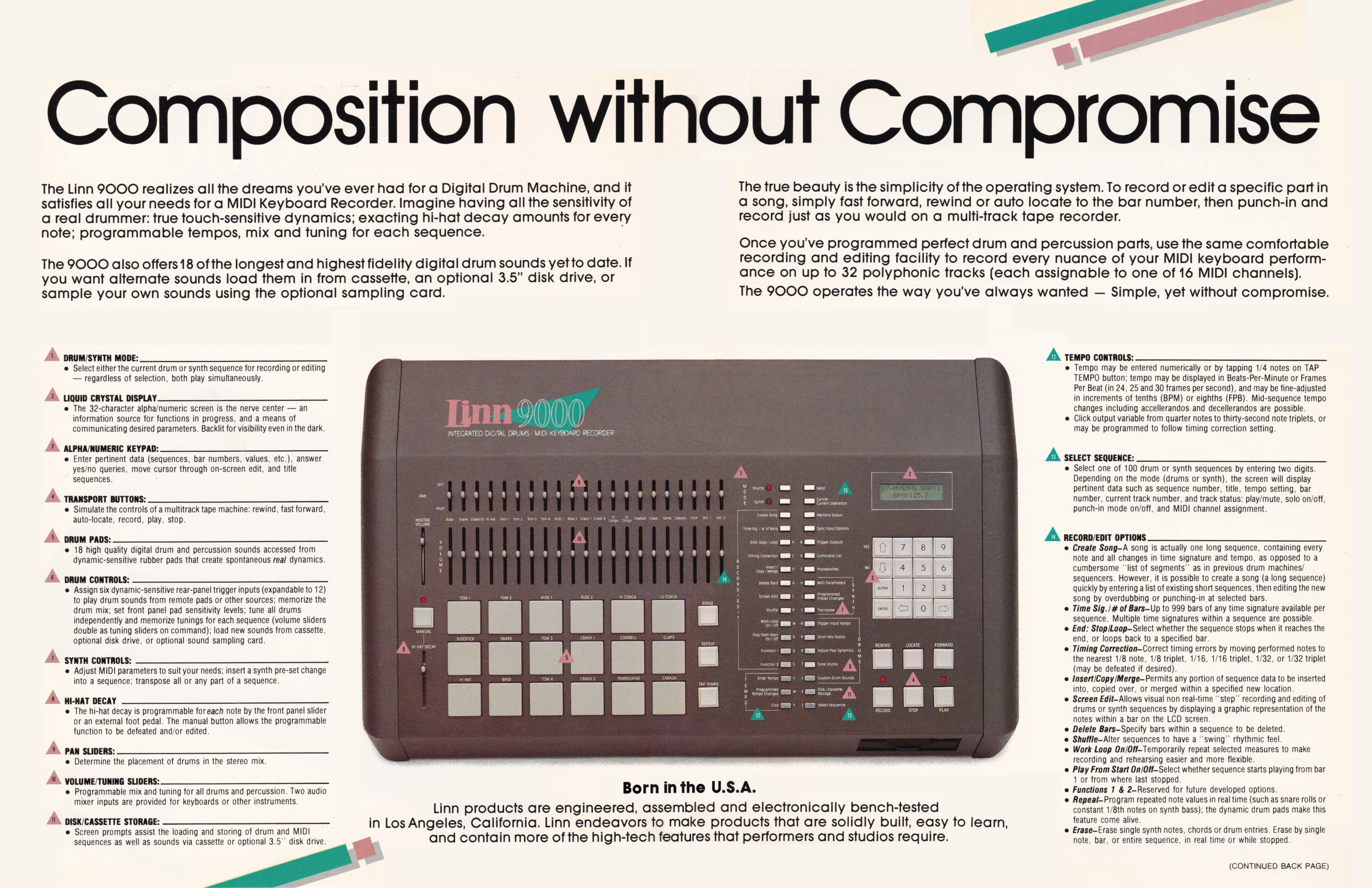
page 2 and 3

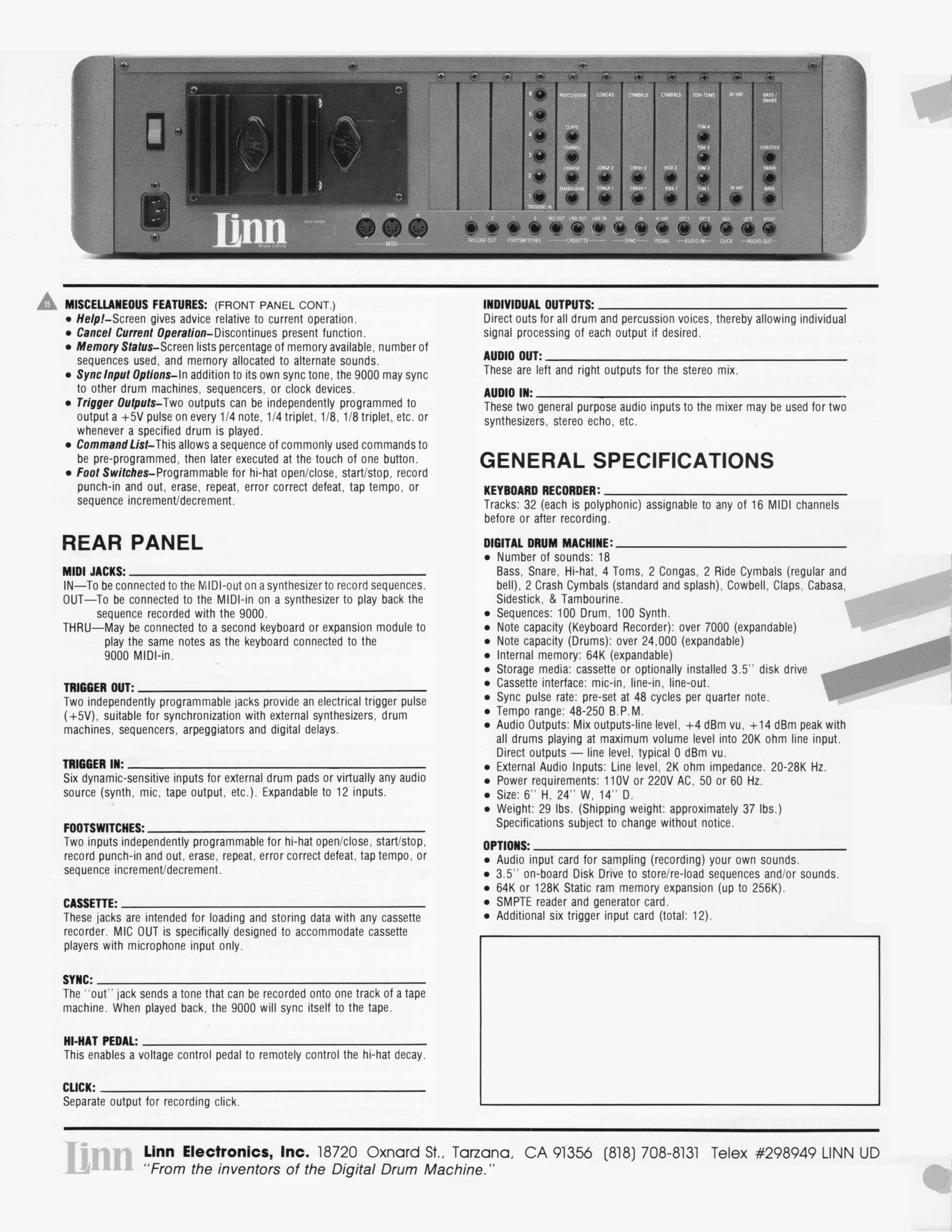
page 4

== Notable Users ==
Many top artists, producers, engineers and drummers have used the Forat F9000 or F9000 upgrades to the Linn 9000. They include:

- Aerosmith
- Kenneth "Babyface" Edmonds
- Warryn Campbell
- Chicago
- Stewart Copeland (The Police)
- Def Leppard
- Eddie Van Halen
- Jon Gass
- Janet Jackson
- Michael Jackson
- Randy Jackson
- Jimmy Jam and Terry Lewis
- Glen Ballard
- L.A. Reid
- Madonna
- Susan Rogers (Prince)
- Will Smith
- Rod Stewart
- Stock, Aitken & Waterman
- Damon Thomas
- Stevie Wonder
