= Linn 9000 =

Electronic musical instrument by Linn Electronics

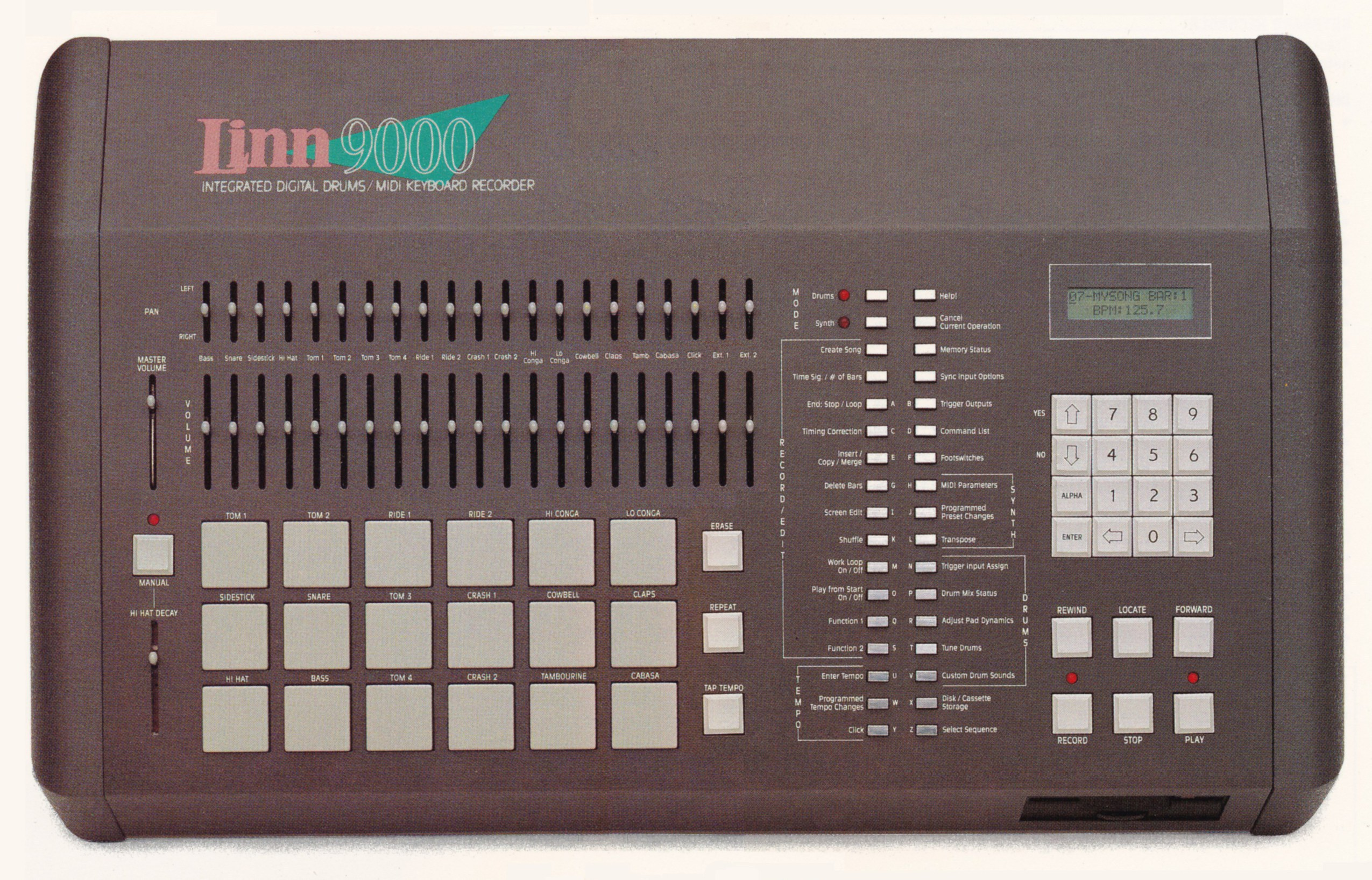
- Linn 9000 integrated digital drum machine and MIDI keyboard recorder.
- Manufacturer: Linn Electronics
- Dates: 1984–1986
- Price: $5,000 US ($7,000 fully expanded)

Technical specifications
- Polyphony: Polyphonic 13 voices
- Timbrality: Multitimbral 18 voices
- Synthesis type: 8 bit Digital Samples / 11 kHz - 37kHz
- Storage memory: 100 Drum Sequences, 100 MIDI Sequences - 10,490 notes
- Effects: Individual level, pan, tuning for all sounds

Input/output
- Keyboard: 18 large (1.25 inch square) velocity and pressure sensitive rubber pads
- External control: MIDI In, out and thru, Foot Switch x2, Foot Controller x1 (hi-hat), Sync Tone In/Out, trigger outputs x2, trigger inputs x6

The Linn 9000 is an electronic musical instrument manufactured by Linn Electronics as the successor to the LinnDrum. It was introduced in 1984 at a list price of $5,000, ($7,000 fully expanded) and about 1,100 units were produced.

It combined MIDI sequencing and audio sampling (optional) with a set of 18 velocity and pressure sensitive performance pads, to produce an instrument optimized for use as a drum machine. It featured programmable hi-hat decay, 18 digital drum sounds, a mixer section, 18 individual 1/4" outputs, an LCD, 6 external trigger inputs and an internal floppy disk drive (optional). Despite possessing innovative and groundbreaking features and influencing many future drum machine designs, chronic software bugs led to a reputation for unreliability, and ultimately contributed to the eventual demise of Linn Electronics.

The Linn 9000 was used on many recordings throughout the 1980s, including international hits such as Stacey Q's "Two of Hearts", Divine's "You Think You're a Man", "Give It Up", "I'm So Beautiful", "Show Me Around" and "T Shirts and Tight Blue Jeans", Eric Carmen's "Hungry Eyes", and Rick Astley's "Together Forever". Michael Lloyd also used it in videos from the hit children's video series Kidsongs in 1986 and 1987.

The Linn 9000 would get a new lease on life when Forat Music and Electronics purchased Linn's remaining assets, fixed all of the bugs, added new features and dubbed it the Forat F9000.

== History ==
The Linn 9000 was Roger Linn's first attempt to create an integrated sampling/sequencing/MIDI workstation, but it was plagued with problems from the beginning. On early models, the power supply over-heated the CPU and had to be replaced under warranty, but insurmountable issues with the Linn 9000's operating system forced its eventual demise.

The original Linn 9000 operating system had numerous bugs and it was common for the machine to lock-up and lose data. The OS was mostly written in an esoteric high-level programming language called Forth with some machine language. In early versions, some of the FORTH code produced unacceptable delays in user interface functions and was rewritten in machine language. Linn attempted to debug, rewrite and enhance the operating system after firing the engineers who had written it, but he was limited by the 64K code space memory segmentation in the Intel 8088 microprocessor that left no room for new features. Further software development was abandoned.

The flawed Linn 9000 operating system was also used in the LinnSequencer, a rack mount 32 track hardware MIDI sequencer introduced by Linn Electronics in 1985. As a result, both machines earned a reputation for being notoriously unreliable. A planned rack mount successor to the Linn 9000, the LinnDrum Midistudio, which would have utilized the same operating system, was never released.

These issues contributed to the eventual demise of Linn Electronics in 1986, but Linn drew heavily on the Linn 9000 and the Sequential Circuits Studio 440 when he designed the Akai MPC60, released in 1988.

Forat Music and Electronics purchased the assets of Linn Electronics, recreating the Linn 9000 with a stable, bug-free operating system, releasing it as the Forat F9000 in 1987.

== Features ==
The Linn 9000 has eighteen 8-bit 11 kHz ~ 37 kHz digitally sampled drum sounds: bass, snare, sidestick, hihat, two crash cymbals, two ride cymbals, four toms, cabasa, tambourine, high and low congas, cowbell and clap. The Linn 9000 had many firsts. In addition to being the first drum machine to incorporate a MIDI sequencer, it was the first drum machine with custom sounds, sampling capability (optional), a floppy disk drive (optional) and an LCD.

The programmable hi-hat decay is a unique feature that provides seven open hi-hat positions in addition to the closed hi-hat, allowing for subtle and expressive performances.

The Linn 9000's most distinctive feature was 18 large (1.25 inch square) velocity- and pressure-sensitive rubber pads. Pad pressure is used for the Note Repeat feature. If holding Timing Correction and applying continuous pressure to a pad while in record mode, that note is automatically repeated at the Timing Correction note value setting. The velocity (volume) level of each repeated note is determined by the amount of pressure applied at the time the note is played. Similar rubber pads would be seen on many subsequent drum machines and controllers including the Akai MPC60 and the Akai MPC4000.

=== Standard features ===
- 32 track MIDI hardware sequencer
- 18 digital sample drum sounds
- 18 rubber velocity and pressure sensitive pads
- Note repeat
- Programmable 8 position hi-hat decay
- A mixer section providing real-time control over volume, tuning, and pan
- 18 on-board sliders and pan pots
- 18 individual 1/4" outputs
- Backlit LCD
- Online help
- Cassette interface: mic-in, line-in, line-out
- 6 external trigger inputs (expandable to 12)

=== Optional features ===
- 12 external trigger inputs (6 standard)
- Internal 3.5" double density floppy disk drive
- Digital sampling capability
- Up to four custom sounds
- SMPTE (never deployed by Linn)

== Brochure (1984) ==
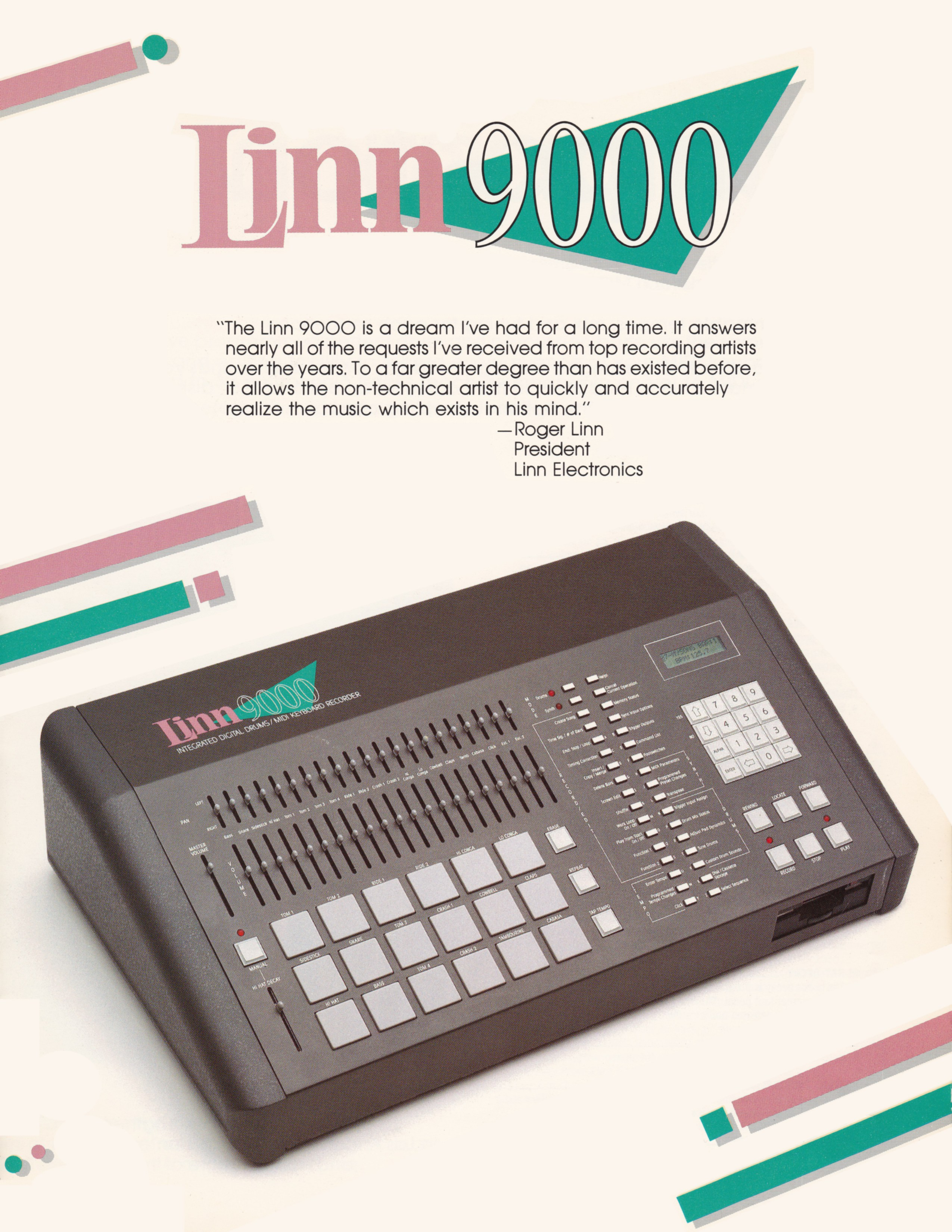
page 1

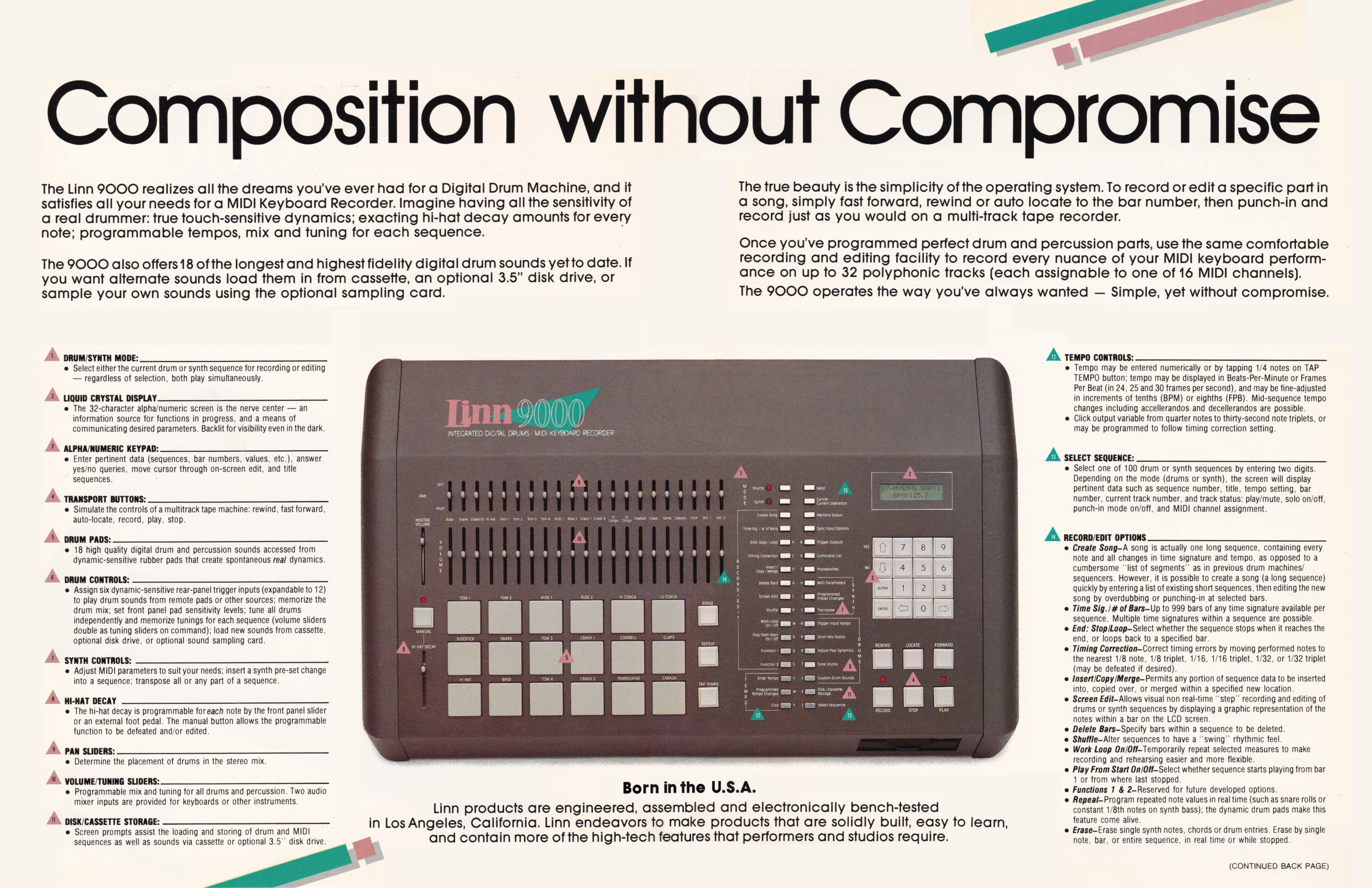
page 2 and 3

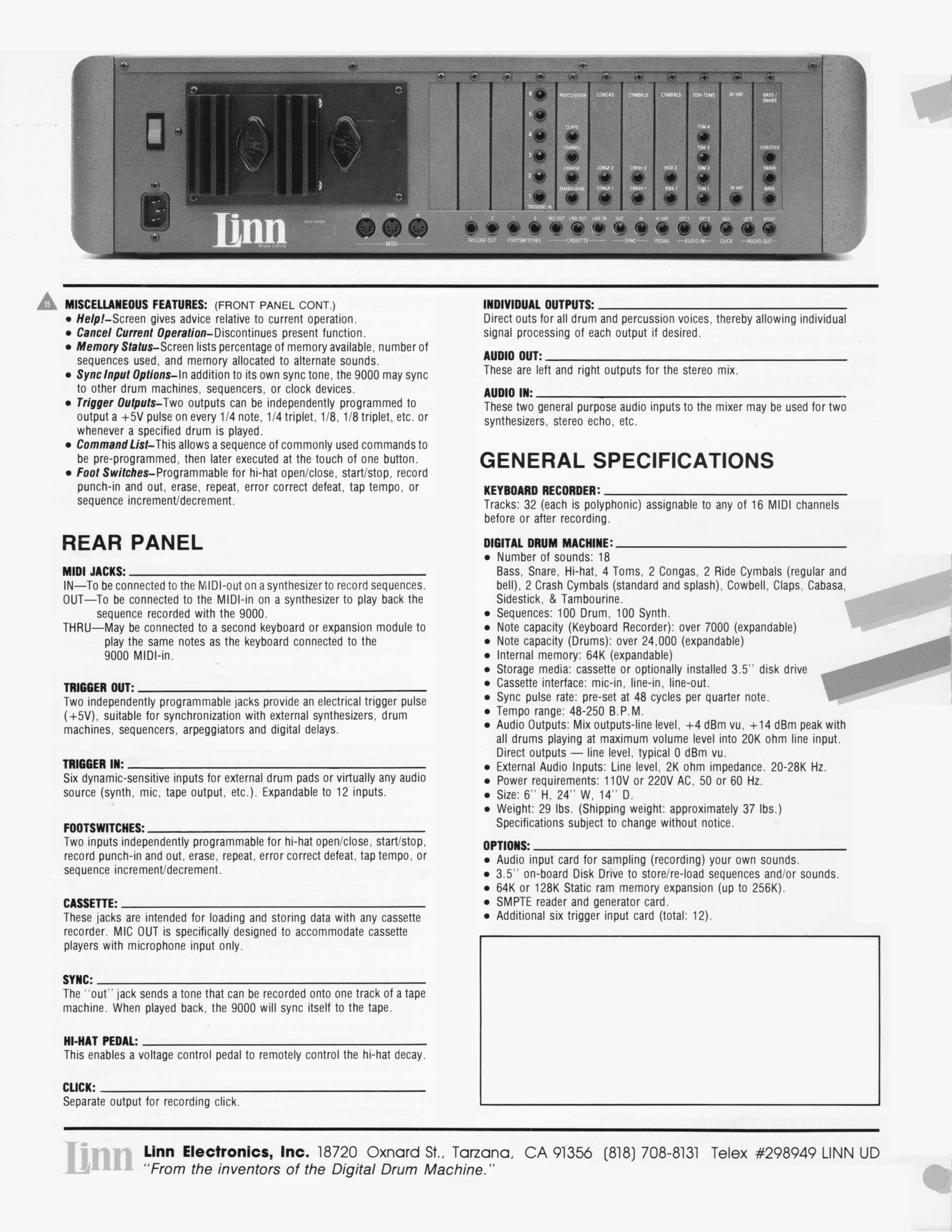
page 4

== Notable users ==
- The Human League
- Stevie Wonder
- Jean-Michel Jarre
- Howard Jones
- Starship
- George Michael
- Dead Or Alive
- Queen
- Steve Porcaro
- Paula Abdul
- Cameo in "Word Up!"

== Architecture ==
The Linn 9000 circuitry is deployed as a mother board with 14 slots. Daughter boards are used to deploy standard and optional features, with slots on the back panel resembling PCs of the time. It uses the Intel 8088 CPU chip.
