= LinnDrum =

Drum machine

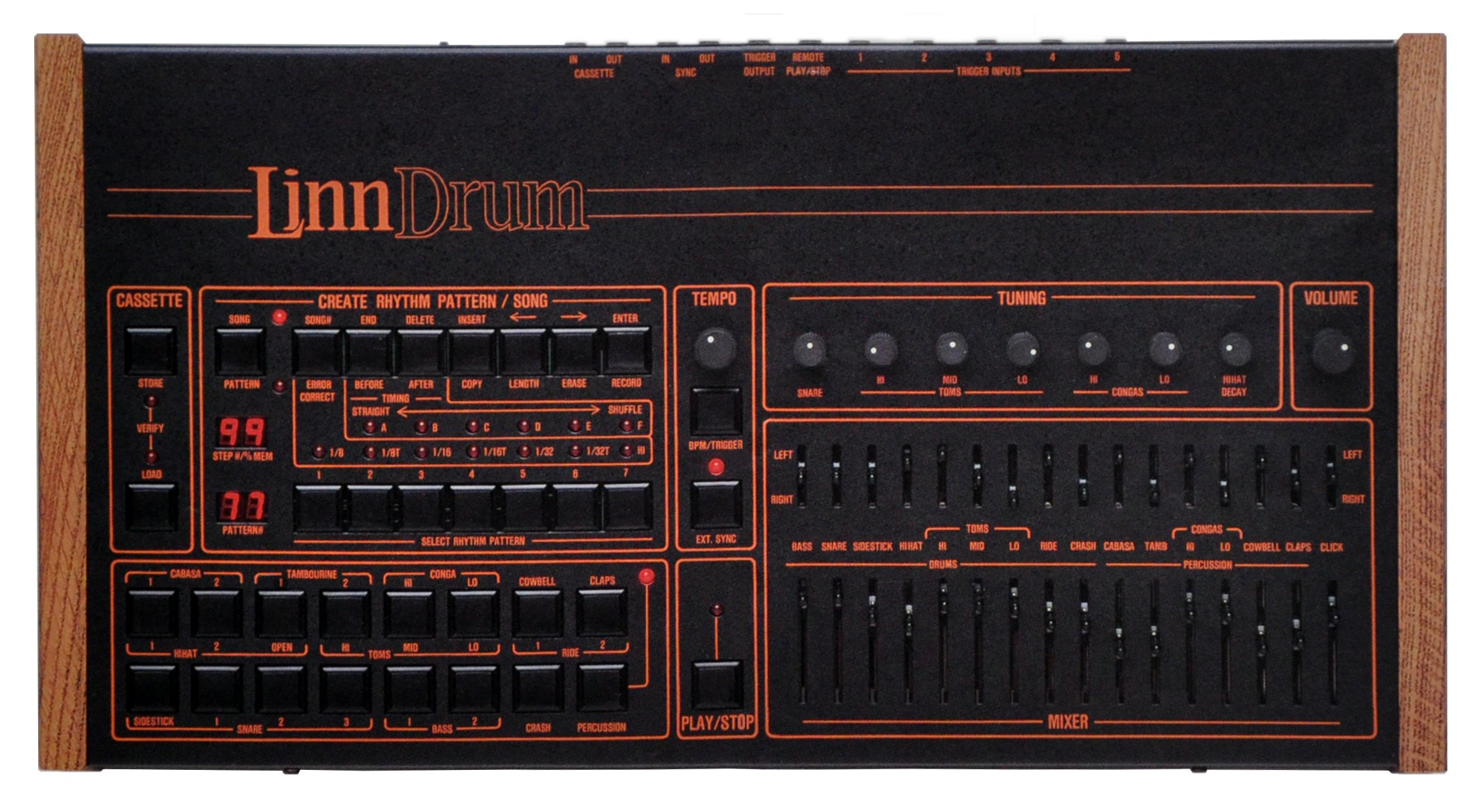
- Front panel
- Manufacturer: Linn Electronics
- Dates: 1982–1985
- Price: US$2,995

Technical specifications
- Polyphony: Polyphonic 12 voices
- Timbrality: Multitimbral 15 parts
- Synthesis type: 8-bit digital samples, 28–35 kHz
- Storage memory: 56 user patterns, 42 preset drum patterns, 49 songs
- Effects: Individual level and pan for all sounds, tuning for snare, tom and conga only

Input/output
- Keyboard: 15 hard plastic "pads"
- External control: DIN sync (pre-MIDI), third-party MIDI Retrofit Kit, trigger inputs x5

The LinnDrum, often erroneously referred to as the LM-2, is a drum machine manufactured by Linn Electronics between 1982 and 1985. About 5,000 units were sold.

== Development ==
The LinnDrum was designed by the American engineer Roger Linn. It was cheaper and more widely produced than his first drum machine, the Linn LM-1 Drum Computer, which was affordable only to wealthy musicians and studios.

== Release ==
The LinnDrum sold far more units than the Linn LM-1 and its successor, the Linn 9000, combined. It was used by artists and producers including Trevor Horn, Mark Knopfler, George Michael, Naked Eyes, Stock Aitken Waterman (SAW), Sandy Vee, and Justin Hayward. When Linn Electronics closed in 1986, Forat Music and Electronics purchased its assets and offered service, sounds, and modifications for the LinnDrum.
