= Forat, Iran =

Village in Semnan province, Iran

Forat Persian: فرات
- Village
- Location within Iran
- Coordinates: 35°55′33″N 54°18′49″E
- Country: Iran
- Province: Semnan
- County: Damghan
- District: Amirabad
- Rural District: Qohab-e Rastaq

Population (2016)
  - Total: 397
- Time zone: UTC+3:30 (IRST)

Forat (Persian: فرات) (Note: Also romanized as Forāt and Frāt) is a village in, and the capital of, Qohab-e Rastaq Rural District in Amirabad District of Damghan County, Semnan province, Iran.

== Demographics ==
=== Population ===
At the time of the 2006 National Census, the village's population was 280 in 83 households. The following census in 2011 counted 243 people in 81 households. The 2016 census measured the population of the village as 397 people in 141 households.
