= Linn LM-1 =

Early 1980s drum machine

Linn LM-1 Drum Computer
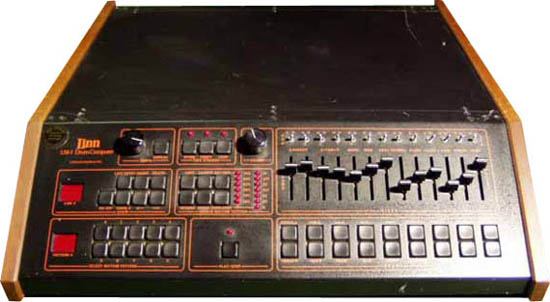
- Linn LM-1 Drum Computer Rev. 3
- Manufacturer: Linn Electronics
- Dates: 1980–1983
- Price: US $4,995 - $5,500 - $3,995

Technical specifications
- Polyphony: polyphonic: Rev. 1: 10 voices, Rev. 2 & 3: 9 voices
- Timbrality: multitimbral 12 voices
- Synthesis type: 8-bit LPCM samples / 28 kHz
- Storage memory: 100 memory patches
- Effects: Individual level, pan, tuning for all sounds

Input/output
- Keyboard: 12 hard plastic "pads"
- External control: pre-MIDI, external clock oscillator input, tape sync in/out

The Linn LM-1 Drum Computer is a drum machine manufactured by Linn Electronics and released in 1980. It was one of the first programmable drum machines and the first to use samples of acoustic drums. Its designer, the American engineer Roger Linn, wanted a machine that would produce more realistic sounds and offer more than preset patterns.

The LM-1 became a staple of 1980s pop music and helped establish drum machines as credible tools. It appeared on records by artists including the Human League, Gary Numan, Mecano, Icehouse, Michael Jackson, Queen, Tears For Fears, Steve Winwood and particularly Prince. The LM-1 was succeeded in 1982 by the LinnDrum.

== Development ==
The LM-1 was designed by the American engineer and guitarist Roger Linn in the late 1970s. Linn was dissatisfied with drum machines available at the time, such as the Roland CR-78, and wanted a machine that did not simply play preset patterns and "sound like crickets".

At the suggestion of the Toto keyboardist Steve Porcaro, Linn recorded samples of real drums to a computer chip. By the late 1970s, the technology required to store and play samples had become small and affordable enough to use in his drum machine. As the samples were stored as digital audio, they would not degrade like those of earlier devices, such as the Chamberlin Rhythmate, which used tape loops.

Linn said the samples were mostly played by the session drummer Art Wood, with handclaps by Tom Petty and the Heartbreakers. Linn introduced the quantization feature after he discovered that his code would record his playing and play it back in perfect sixteenth notes, effectively correcting his timing. To implement swing beats, he delayed the playback of alternate sixteenth notes.

== Sounds and features ==
The LM-1 features twelve 8-bit percussion samples, which can be individually tuned: kick, snare, hi-hat, cabasa, tambourine, two toms, two congas, cowbell, claves, and hand claps. Cymbal sounds were not included due to the cost of long sound samples at the time. Each sound can be tuned and has its own output to allow processing by external hardware. The LM-1 also introduced features such as "timing correct" (quantization) and "shuffle" (swing), and the ability to chain patterns.

== Release ==
The LM-1 was announced in 1979 and released in 1980 as the first Linn Electronics product. It retailed for $5,500, making it accessible only to wealthy musicians and studios. A flyer for the machine promised that it would provide "real drums at your fingertips". Only 525 were built; Linn sold them by bringing prototypes to showbusiness parties. Early adopters included Peter Gabriel, Fleetwood Mac and Stevie Wonder, and the pianist Leon Russell, who used it on every track on his 1979 album Life and Love.

The LM-1 became a staple of 1980s pop music, used by acts including the Human League, Gary Numan, Michael Jackson, Giorgio Moroder, ABC, Devo, John Carpenter and particularly Prince. According to The Guardian, the LM-1, along with the Oberheim DMX, helped establish drum machines as "credible, powerful instruments" rather than toys. The Vinyl Factory wrote that it was "leaps and bounds ahead of the competition" and a significant step forward for music production.

Linn released two revisions to correct problems with early models. In 1982, he released the cheaper and more stable LinnDrum, which was a commercial success. In 2005, the LM-1 was inducted into the TECnology Hall of Fame, which honors "products and innovations that have had an enduring impact on the development of audio technology".
