= MonoNeon =

American bassist, experimental musician, and singer

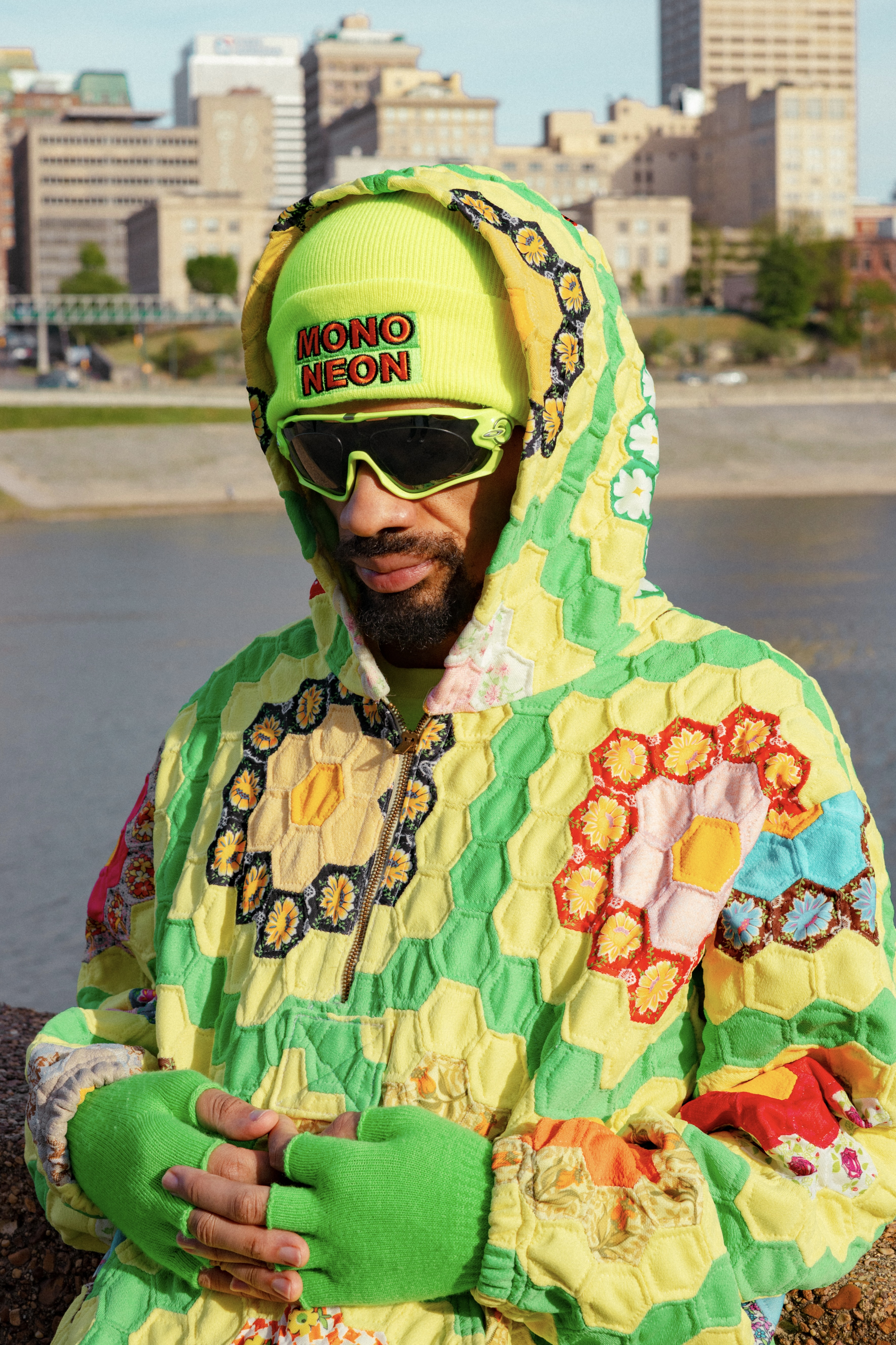
- MonoNeon in 2026

Background information
- Born: Dywane Eric Thomas Jr. August 6, 1990 (age 36); Memphis, Tennessee, U.S.
- Genres: Avant-funk; Jazz; Experimental; Microtonal; R&B; Hip-hop; Gospel; Blues; Noise music
- Occupations: Musician; singer; composer; songwriter
- Instruments: Vocals, guitar, bass guitar, keyboard, quarter-tone bass

Dywane Eric Thomas Jr. (born August 6, 1990), professionally known as MonoNeon, is an American bassist, experimental musician, singer and songwriter from Memphis, Tennessee, raised in Orange Mound. His work spans multiple experimental projects and collaborations, including with American musician Prince. MonoNeon was the last bassist Prince hired before his death in 2016. He has since become known for his harmonized viral videos, and his compositions and playing style that utilize microtonality. MonoNeon has worked, performed and recorded with Pete Rock, Bon Iver, Ne-Yo, Georgia Anne Muldrow, Zedd, Mavis Staples, Jacob Collier, John Scofield and George Clinton. MonoNeon has also produced original music featuring Katt Williams. In 2021, MonoNeon won his first Grammy for his contribution on Nas album King's Disease as the bassist and additional producer on the song "All Bad" (credited as "MnoNeon").

== Early life ==
Thomas was raised in a musical family, the son of a bass guitarist, Dywane Thomas, played with The Bar-Kays, Pops Staples, Denise LaSalle, J. Blackfoot, and Zucchero. MonoNeon's grandfather was jazz pianist, Charles Thomas, played with Ron Carter, Billy Higgins, etc. He began playing bass at the age of four years old, independent of formal lessons (self-taught), playing in church and practicing in his grandma's living room. When he was about 11 or 12 years old, he performed with Bar-Kays, playing bass guitar. Larry Dodson would call Thomas on stage to play a bass solo with the band.

At 16 years old, MonoNeon played bass in church under the mentorship of gospel singer Shea Norman.

During his brief stay at Berklee College of Music MonoNeon studied microtonality and performed with David Fiuczynski.

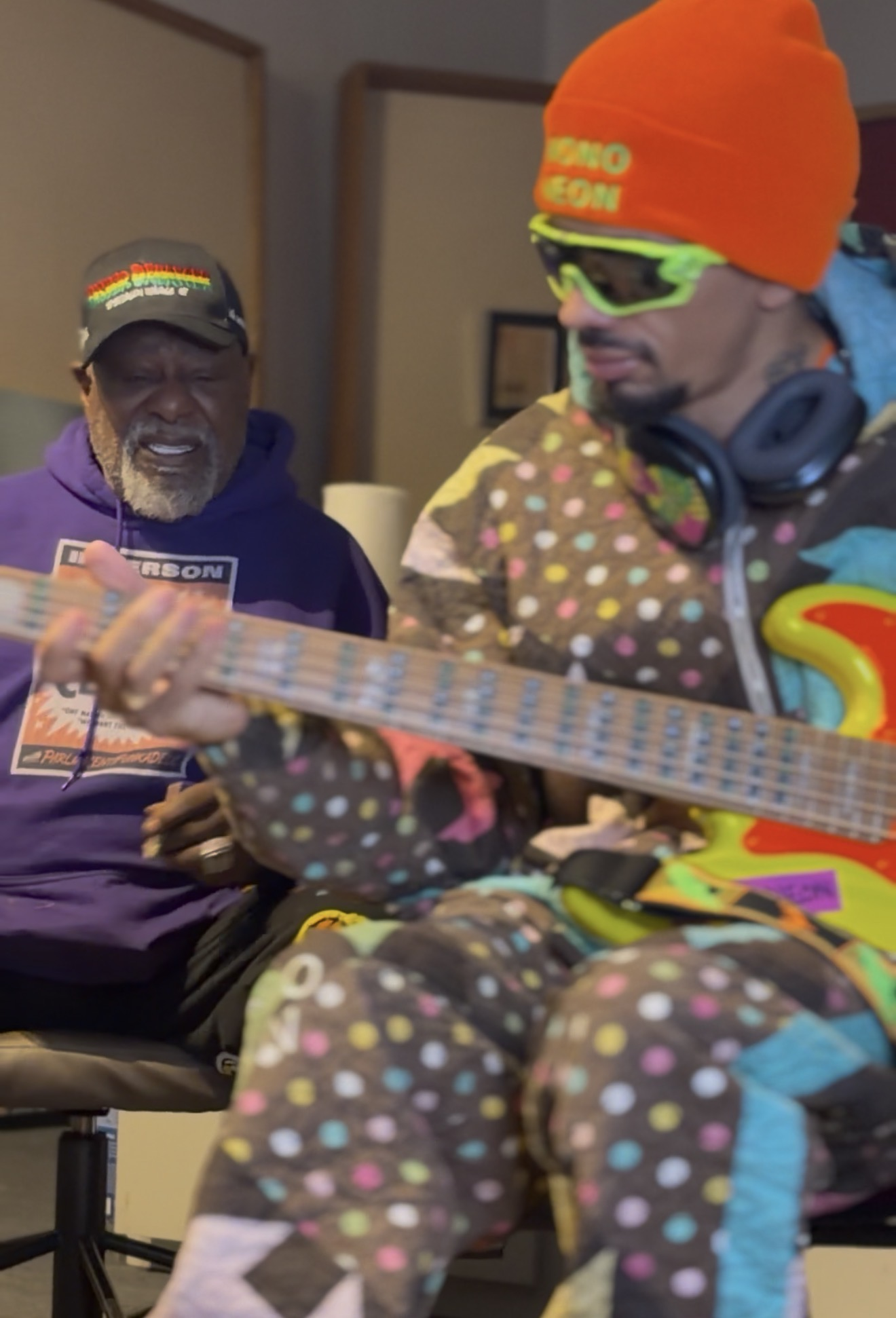
George Clinton & MonoNeon in Tallahassee, Florida (2026)

== Career ==
In 2009, Thomas was featured on the GospelChops Bass Sessionz Vol.1 project with Andrew Gouche, Hadrien Feraud, Damian Erskine, Janek Gwizdala, Anthony Nembhard, and Robert "Bubby" Lewis.

In 2010, Thomas played bass on the Libra Scale album by Grammy Award-winning artist Ne-Yo, and the album Directions by Forest Won with Georgia Anne Muldrow. Thomas was featured in the article, "Bass to the Future", in issue 52 of the UK Bass Guitar magazine.

In 2012, MonoNeon joined David Fiuczynski and Planet Microjam. Also in 2012, he released his solo avant-garde album, Down-to-Earth Art as MonoNeon.

In early 2013, Thomas released an album called Southern Visionary under the pseudonym MonoNeon. This album features several microtonal musicians. He also released an album entitled Uncle Curtis Answered The Lobster Telephone.

MonoNeon teamed up with producer Kriswontwo to release an EP called, WEON.

July 2014, MonoNeon made his debut performance as the bassist for Screaming Headless Torsos at Jalisco Jazz Festival in Mexico.

In 2015, MonoNeon began playing bass with Prince and his protégé, Judith Hill. Some of the live shows have been at Paisley Park. On 11 January 2016, Tidal released the track Ruff Enuff by MonoNeon, only four and a half days after its initial recording. The instrumental track features Prince as producer and on keyboards. The following day, the track was replaced with a vocal version with lead vocals on vocoder by Adrian Crutchfield. When Prince wasn't playing his solo piano shows, he was breaking in a new band at Paisley Park with MonoNeon as his new bassist.

In 2017, MonoNeon joined Miles Electric Band, a group led by Miles Davis nephew Vince Wilburn Jr. (drummer) and keyboardist Robert Irving III. He performed at the Macy's Thanksgiving Day Parade with Kat Graham.

In 2018, MonoNeon performed at the Billboard Music Awards and on The Ellen DeGeneres Show with Zedd and Maren Morris.

On July 7, 2018, MonoNeon played a show with Joe Russo and Eric Krasno billed as (nO*sO*nO*). While the three musicians have played together on many occasions in various other supergroup formations, this marked the first performance as a dedicated trio under this moniker. For most of the two-set performance, surprise guest keyboardist Peter Levin (Gregg Allman Band) played on several numbers. Relying heavily on improvisation, (nO*sO*nO*) dug deep into the funk, jazz, and psychedelic rock catalogs. Covers of Jimi Hendrix's “Manic Depression”, The Beatles‘ “Get Back”, Billy Cobham's “Stratus”, and John Scofield's “Hottentot”, appeared throughout the free-flowing jams and captivated the audience with their supersonic chemistry.

In 2021, MonoNeon teamed up with Davy Nathan and released "Supermane", a full-length album featuring 8 tracks. The track "Done with the B-S", a duet with MonoNeon and Ledisi was featured in Rolling Stone magazine. The album was produced, written and recorded by MonoNeon and Davy Nathan in Nathan's home studio in Los Angeles. They describe the album as a step outside of the vocal comfort zone of MonoNeon.

MonoNeon was nominated for a Grammy in 2021 for his bass work on Jacob Collier’s album Djesse Vol. 3, on the song "In My Bones". Djesse Vol. 3 was nominated for Album of the Year.

For the 65th Grammys MonoNeon was Grammy nominated for his work on Cory Henry's album, "Operation Funk" (Best Progressive R&B Album nomination). MonoNeon is one of the writers, guitarist and bassist on the songs "Ecstasy" and "The Line".

For 68th Grammys MonoNeon was nominated for his bass work on Eric Gales' album "A Tribute to LJK" (nominated for Best Contemporary Blues Album).

In 2024, he performed at the Black Music Honors award show in a tribute to Bootsy Collins.

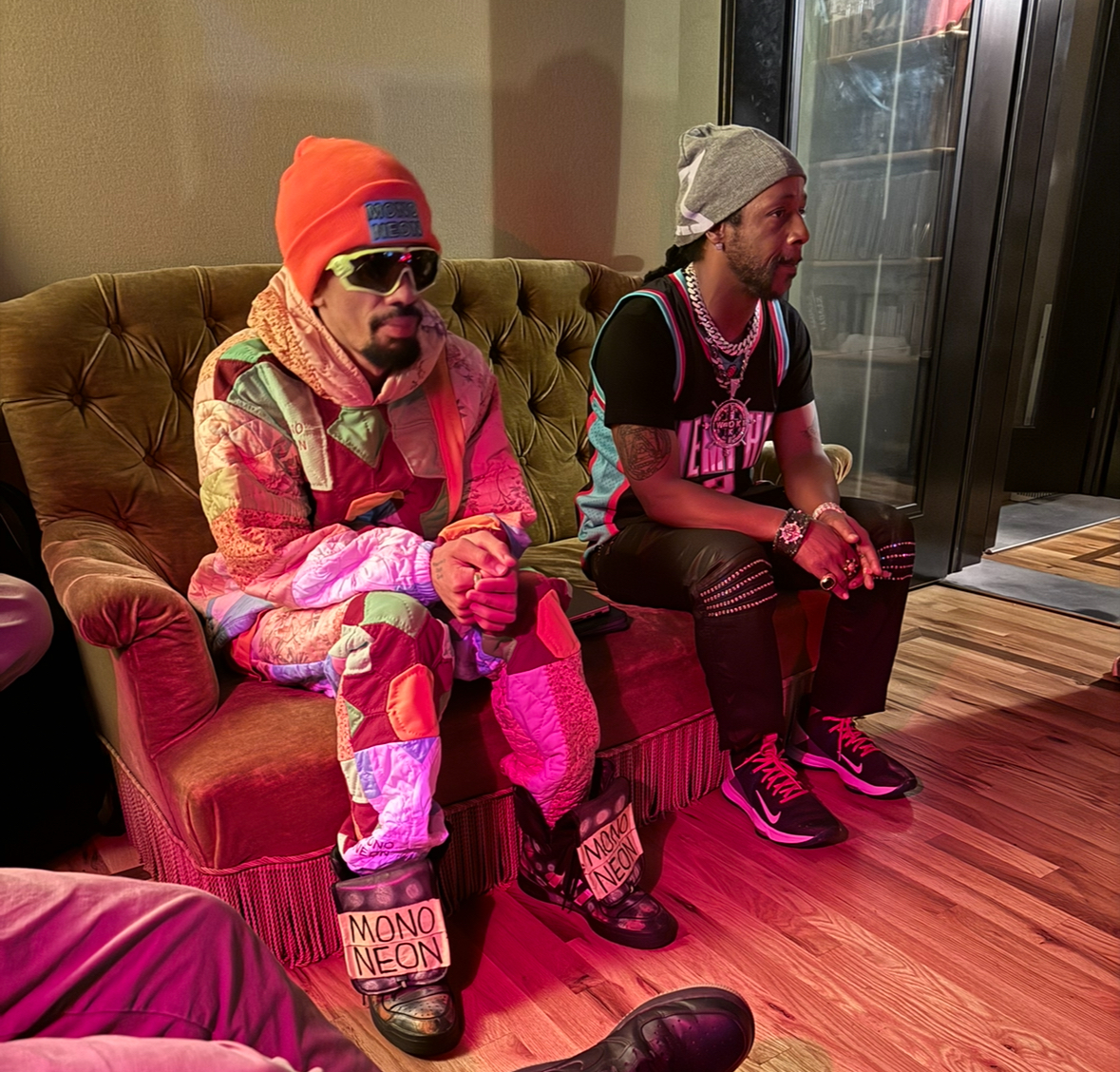
MonoNeon and Katt Williams at Court Square Recordings in Memphis, Tennessee (2024)

MonoNeon has produced music for comedian Katt Williams featuring Katt rapping, including two tracks that blend psychedelic funk, hip-hop and R&B influences. “God Reason” features George Clinton and James Fauntleroy and “You Can Be A Winner” features Lil Mo and Fauntleroy. Katt came to Memphis, Tennessee to record at Court Square Recordings.

== Musical style ==
While Thomas is right-handed, he plays left-handed on an upside down right-handed bass guitar, which allows him to use heavy string bending on the upper strings, inspired by Albert King as a kid. Thomas' slapping style/technique is unique because he is executing everything upside-down, while traditionally using the thumb for slaps and fingers for pops. In a free/improvisational setting, listeners may hear the use of Indian melodic inflections and ornaments in Thomas' playing, including the use of gamakas. Another trademark is his use of randomness and mistakes in performance, taking unintentional ideas made in error, and spontaneously turning them into usable or intentional material.

MonoNeon's overall playing style on bass can be described as "funky with unusual characteristics". His sound is a combination of bold use of dissonance, playing a few cents off from 12-tone equal temperament (microtones) and unpredictable phrasing. Marcus Miller, among others, has praised his unique playing style. His musical background is heavily influenced by Southern soul, blues and funk. In a Bass Player magazine interview, Miller mentioned Thomas as one of several "young bad cats" he has met on the scene.

=== Experimental works ===
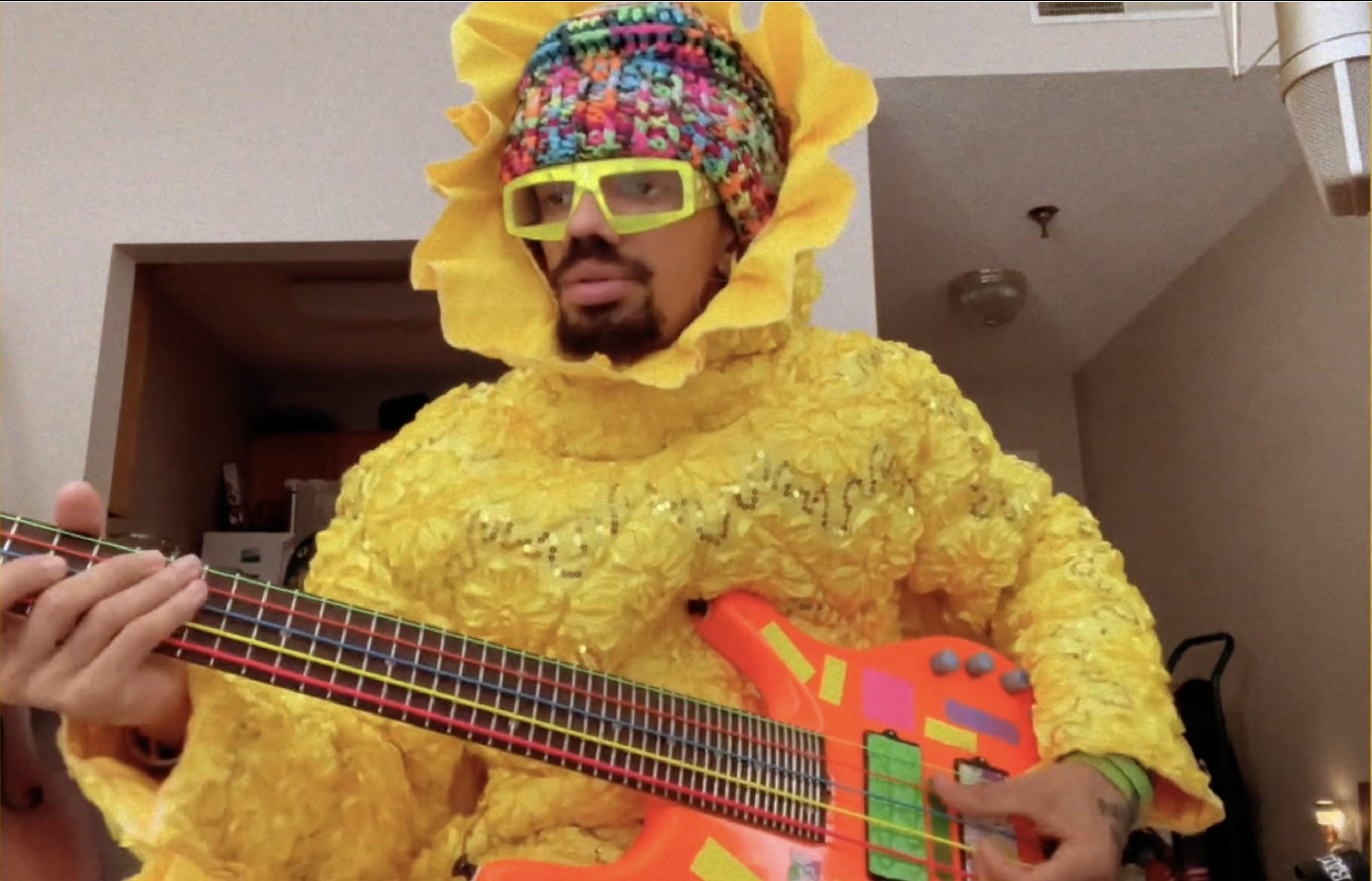
MonoNeon with his quarter-tone bass (2021)

Thomas' experimental approach has been compared to the 20th century composer John Cage. The idea of conceptual art plays a role in his musical sensibilities, as reflected in his early 2011 recordings. Thomas began developing an idea of bass accompanying improvisations with an AM/FM radio. The improvisations/compositions are based on radio art, some of which can be heard on his album entitled Introspection of PolyNeon. The "Polyneon" concept is something Thomas created through introspection and when he stopped thinking about the goal of becoming or being a great musician.

Thomas is notable for his "readymade bass", inspired by his love for Dadaism and other avant garde art movements. The primary characteristics of the "readymade bass" is the ordinary sock covering the entire headstock and the name “MonoNeon” on the body of his bass. The use of colorful duct tape and other mundane items upon his basses has become a defining visual style for Thomas.

A microtonal bass built for MonoNeon by Tim Cloonan of CallowHill Guitars. The bass is built to play quarter tones.

=== Microtonal-Southern Soul concept ===
Microtonal–southern soul is an experimental musical approach developed by MonoNeon, combining the harmonic language of microtonal music with stylistic elements of Southern soul and funk. The term has been used by MonoNeon to describe a series of minimalistic productions, compositions and recordings beginning in the early 2011s, including works from his album Southern Visionary (2013) and related singles. MonoNeon frequently employs quarter-tone intervals and subtle "out-of-tune" pitch inflections, creating a sound that departs from standard Western tuning while retaining a recognizable funk and Southern soul foundation.

=== Fashion style ===
MonoNeon's sense of fashion, with custom vibrant quilted outfits, high visibility/dayglo color schemes and crochet masks, mirrors his music, which is just as unconventional and expressive. In 2024, MonoNeon recorded a song called "Quilted" featuring George Clinton, expressing his love for quilted clothes.

== Discography ==
=== Studio albums ===
- Southern Visionary (2013)
- Uncle Curtis Answered The Lobster Telephone (2013)
- MonoNeon Plays Speech (2015)
- Welcome 2 Whateva The Fyuck (2017)
- A Place Called Fantasy (2017)
- I Don't Care Today (Angels & Demons in Lo-Fi) (2018)
- My Feelings Be Peeling (2019)
- Living The Best And Worst Life At The Same Damn Time! (2019)
- Toxic Wasteland 2 The Hills (2020)
- Banana Peel on Capitol Hill (2021)
- Supermane (2021)
- Basquiat & Skittles Album (2021)
- Put on Earth for You (2022)
- There Goes That Man Again Turning Water Into Gin & Juice (2022)
- Jelly Belly Dirty Somebody (2023)
- MonoNeon On Synthesizer (2024)
- Quilted Stereo (2024)
- You Had Your Chance... Bad Attitude (2025)
- Crusty Neon Missionary Baptist Church (2025)
- This Dirt Loves Me More Than You (2026)
- THA DUMB STUFF (album) (2026)

=== Singles, extended plays and live albums ===
- Polyneon (2010)
- Introspection of PolyNeon (2011)
- Noise Catharsis (2011)
- Johnnie Taylor and John Cage (2011)
- The Kitschy EP (2011)
- MonoNeon (2012)
- Ming Neon (2012)
- Down-to-Earth Art (2012)
- John Cage on Soul Train (2014)
- Selfie Quickie (2015)
- Selfie Quickie 2wooo (2017)
- Gospel According to the Little Green Man - EP (2021)
- Mononeon Farts Live In Memphis (2022)
- Wonderland's Disaster Queen EP (2023)
- "Bottom Feeder" (featuring George Clinton and Grandma Liz) (2026)
- "Oblivion (When The World Is Tossing Me) [featuring Grandma Liz]" (2026)
- "THA DUMB STUFF" (featuring George Clinton and Grandma Liz) (2026)
- NEON DADA LIVE! (2026)
- NEON DADA LIVE! 2WO (2026)

=== Session musician, featured artist credits ===
==== 2010s ====
- Libra Scale (2010) by Ne-Yo; bass on "Making A Movie"
- WEON (2013) with Kriswontwo
- Ms. One (2014) by Georgia Anne Muldrow
- The Coldest Winter (2014) by Micki Miller; featured artist, bass on the song "Lost"
- Neon the Won (2015) with Kriswontwo
- Ceremoni (2015) by Kriswontwo - MonoNeon played bass on the song "Elevations" featuring Georgia Anne Muldrow
- RUFF ENUFF [single] (2016) by Prince; MonoNeon: bass, featured artist
- The Cookout Chronicles (2016) by Wax; MonoNeon: producer, bass, microtonal keyboard, drum programming on "Chunky"
- The Pillar (2018) by Jonathan Scales; featured artist, bass on the song "The Trap"
- Swagism (2018) by Ghost-Note; Bass, rhythm guitar and writer
- The Bookends (2019) by Eric Gales
- Schizophrenia: The Yang Project (2019) by Bobby Sparks II
- Finding Myself Again (2019) by Doobie Powell; MonoNeon played rhythm guitar and bass on the song "Walking uP"
- The Videotape (2019) by Micki Miller; featured artist, bass on the song "Elevators"

==== 2020s ====
- Circles (2020) by Mac Miller; MonoNeon played bass on the song, "Complicated"
- PeteStrumentals 3 (2020) by Pete Rock
- Djesse Vol. 3 (2020) by Jacob Collier; Electric bass on the song "In My Bones"
- With The Music (2020) by Matt Johnson; MonoNeon played bass on the songs "With The Music" and "The Freedom"
- King's Disease (2020) by Nas; Bass and additional producer on "All Bad", credited as 'MnoNeon'
- The Power Of One (2020) by Bootsy Collins; MonoNeon played bass on the song “Bewise”
- Scary Goldings IV (2021) with John Scofield
- Paranoia (2022) by Bobby Sparks II
- Natural Brown Prom Queen (2022) by Sudan Archives; Bass, keyboard, drums, producing and writing credits on "It's Already Done"
- Operation Funk (2022) by Cory Henry; Writer, guitar on "Ecstasy" and electric bass, rhythm guitar on "The Line"
- Knower Forever (2023) by Knower; MonoNeon played bass on songs: "The Abyss", "Real Nice Moment", "Nightmare", "It Will Get Real", "Bonus Track"
- Mustard n'Onions (2024) by Ghost-Note; Bass, rhythm guitar and writer
- Remedy (2024) by Doobie Powell; MonoNeon played rhythm guitar and bass on the song "Remedy"
- Phunkin Tribe Interludes (2024) with Daru Jones and Bumpy Knuckles; MonoNeon featured on guitar and bass on all tracks
- Lifetime Achievement Award (2025) by Wax; featured artist, bass on the song "Shit I Use To Do"
- A Tribute To LJK (Little Jimmy King) (2025) by Eric Gales
- The Beginning (2025) by Mike Posner; Featured artist, bass and rhythm guitar on "Time To Make A Change"
- Sable, Fable (2025) by Bon Iver; Bass on "Day One" and "I'll Be There"
- "God Reason" [feat. Katt Williams, George Clinton and James Fauntleroy] (2025); MonoNeon: producer, writer, vocals, electric sitar, bass, keyboards, drum programming
- "You Can Be A Winner" [feat. Katt Williams, James Fauntleroy and Lil' Mo] (2025);MonoNeon: producer, writer, vocals, bass, keyboards, drum programming
- Odyssey [single] (2025) by Maurice "Mobetta" Brown and Kamasi Washington; featured artist, bass
