= Finger vibrato =

String instrument technique using the hand

Finger vibrato is vibrato produced on a string instrument by cyclic hand movements. Despite the name, normally the entire hand moves, and sometimes the entire upper arm. It can also refer to vibrato on some woodwind instruments, achieved by lowering one or more fingers over one of the uncovered holes in a trill-like manner. This flattens the note periodically creating the vibrato.

== Violin and viola ==
There are three types of violin vibrato: finger, arm and wrist vibrato. In finger vibrato, more or less the performer only moves his or her fingers, finger joints. In wrist vibrato, the performer will move the wrist back and forth while keeping the arm in a resting position. In the arm vibrato, the performer opens and closes the arm.

Along with using different bodily movements to create vibrato, there are different methods in regards to forward or backward vibrato movements. Vibrato can be achieved by altering the tone of the note being played. Varying the pitch however, is the most crucial aspect in vibrato.

This can be achieved by either altering the note to a higher or lower tone. Moving the finger, wrist, or arm forward or backward primarily determines the tone. In common practice, violin vibrato oscillates on and below a pitch, though dramatic effect may allow for oscillation above as well as below a pitch. Throughout the 20th century, finger vibrato was normally used in playing all members of the violin family unless otherwise indicated. Toward the end of the century, playing without vibrato became a more accepted technique in certain contexts.

== Guitar ==
In its pure form, vibrato is usually achieved by twisting the wrist rapidly to bend the note slightly, moving to and from the starting pitch. The speed of the vibrato oftentimes has a great effect on the way the note is perceived, with faster vibratos commonly adding tension and stress, while slower vibratos produce a more lyrical sound. The slowest of vibratos can be used to imitate a bowed instrument "growing" a note after its initial inception. Even though this effect refers to volume in bowed instruments, having a pitch variation that follows the same structure of the volume variation in many situations can have the same effect for the listeners.

In contemporary music, finger vibrato is also routinely used by classical guitarists on longer notes, to create an impression of a longer sustain. The technique is also used by jazz bassists to add depth of tone.

=== Axial pitch-shifting ===
Axial vibrato is produced by moving a stopped (held-down) string with the left hand in a direction parallel to its axis, which increases or reduces the tension on the string and thereby alters the pitch. This type of vibrato is typically used by classical guitarists (see Classical guitar technique), but can be performed on any kind of guitar, and is frequently used on steel string and electric guitars. When a classical guitarist sees the term vibrato written in a score, this is generally the first effect that comes to mind.

=== Radial pitch-shifting (string bending) ===
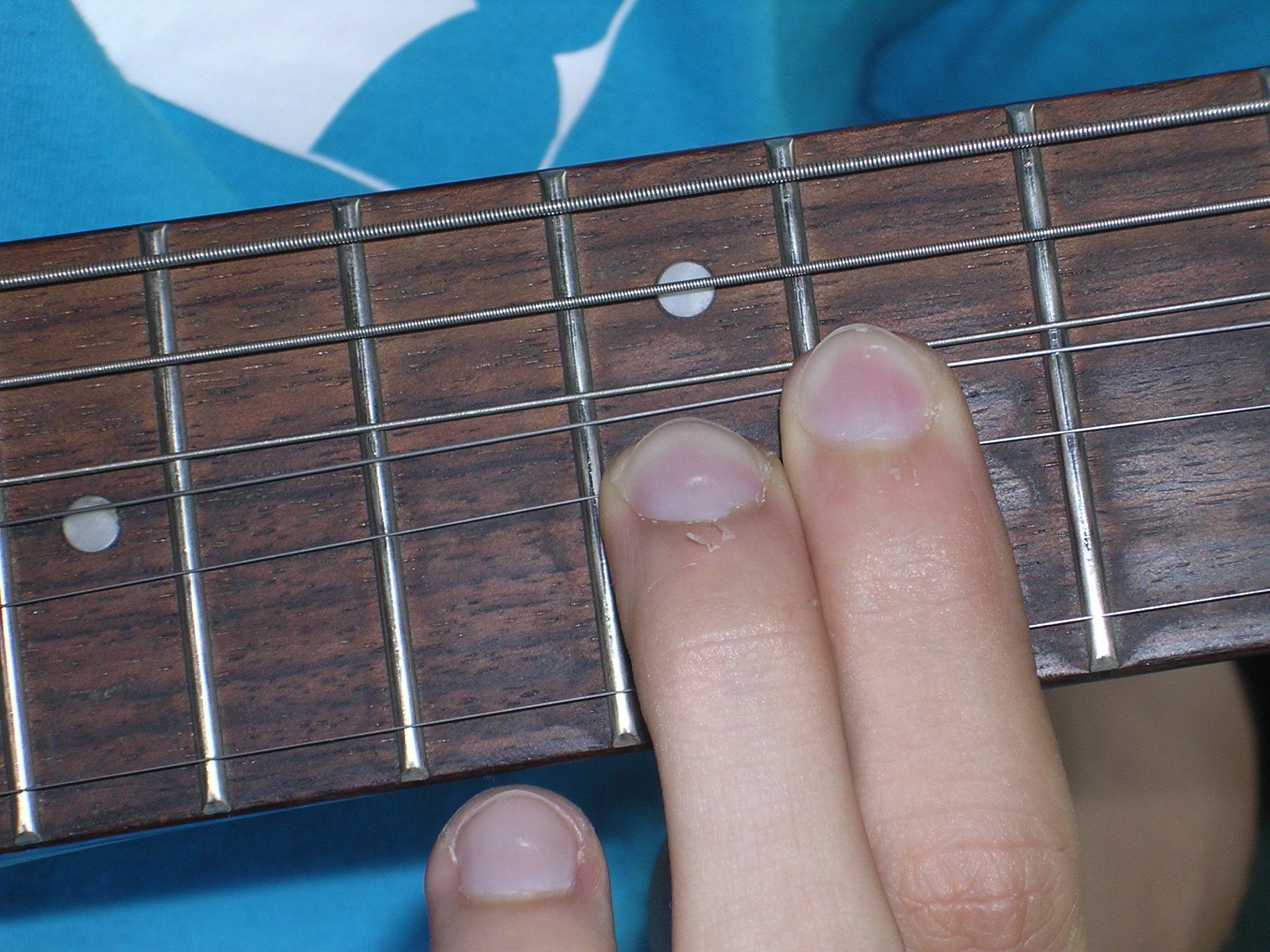
Example of bending on electric guitar

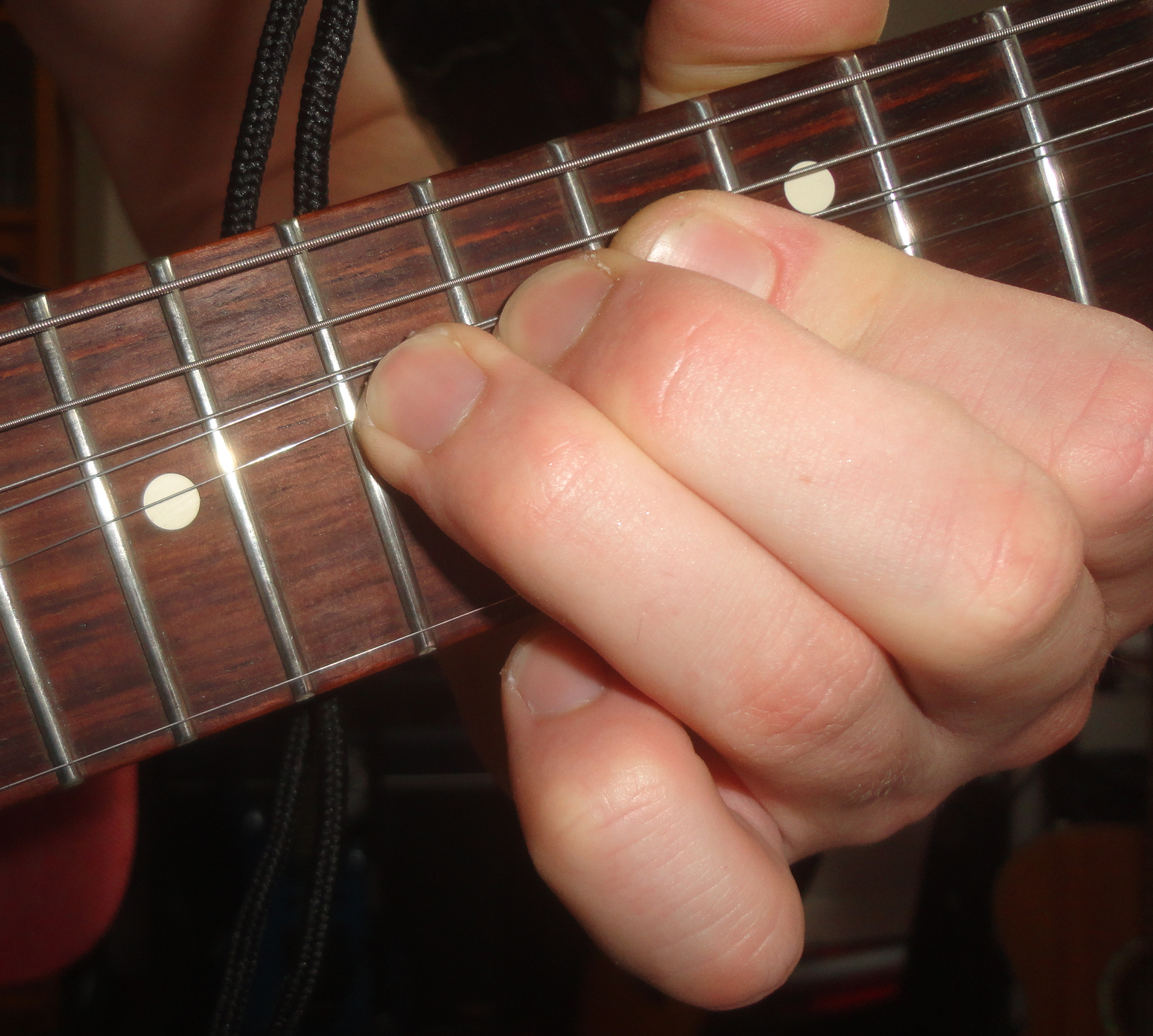
A whole step bend on electric guitar

Radial pitch-shifting (also referred to as "string bending" or "bending") is produced by moving the stopped (held-down) string with the fretting hand in a direction perpendicular to its axis and parallel to the frets. This type of pitch-shifting is associated with blues, rock, country and pop music. The effect generally shifts the pitch over a wider range than axial pitch-shifting. It can produce vibrato as a cyclic variation in pitch, a single up-and-down swoop, or as a shift from one pitch to another that is then held. If the strings and action of the guitar are light enough, a player can bend notes by a semitone or more—so string bending can be a way of making a portamento transition between notes, and not just as a decoration on a note. String bends are one of the few ways to achieve microtonality, especially blue notes, on the guitar.

==== Basic technique ====
A guitar bend demonstrated

To produce a bend, the guitarist puts a finger on the string and then, while pressing the string down to the fingerboard, strikes a tone, and pushes or pulls the string to the side. This has the effect of stretching the string and thus makes its pitch higher. Generally a bend on the lower (6th–4th) strings moves them down vertically, as seen from the guitarist's point of view, and a bend on the higher (3rd–1st) strings moves them up. The technique can also be used with pinch harmonics.

A backward, reverse or release bend involves pressing the string to the fingerboard, pulling or pushing it up to stretch the string first, then striking the string and relaxing the string to normal position. This causes the note to go flat, the reverse direction of straight bend.

Sometimes a guitarist bends a note on a certain string up, while playing the note the string is being bent to on another string, creating a "unison bend".

Bends of one or two semitones are most common, but skilled players may use bends from three semitones to as many as five or more, as can be heard in the solo played by David Gilmour on the song "Another Brick In the Wall Pt.2" from Pink Floyd's album The Wall. In addition to the player's finger strength, the range of a pitch bend is limited to some extent by the type of guitar, string gauge and material, the scale length, and the area of the neck where the bends are played. For example, steel strings bend further in pitch than nylon strings, thin strings further than thick strings, bends in the middle of the neck can go further than bends near the nut, etc. Guitar players may also use a lower tuning to give the strings some slack and achieve further bends.

In blues playing, the target note can be slightly higher or lower than a half or whole step. It can be a quarter tone or even a pitch not present in a tempered scale, being a natural third or seventh instead (or close to it). These may also be so-called blue notes. Blue notes are notes that are outside of the song key, and often even between notes of the chromatic scale. A common blue note is a quarter tone between the minor and major third of a major pentatonic scale. The exact pitch can be varied by the player.

==== Difficulties ====
- The most difficult moment for beginners practicing bends is getting the note bent to proper pitch. Usually the bend changes note pitch exactly by one semitone or one whole tone (two semitones), and most beginners fail to bend a string exactly to the proper pitch, producing "overbends" and "underbends". Most guitar teachers advise playing the target note on a higher fret, listening closely to its sound and trying to bend the string aiming to get exactly the same pitch.
- Bending (especially heavy bending, more than one semitone) usually involves touching more than one string with a left (fretting) hand, as seen in the illustration.
- Bending can make strings break or the guitar go out of tune.
- Bending, especially wide bending, requires specialized finger strength. It is not uncommon for bending to be awkward or tiring for the hands. However, with proper practice, this subsides. String gauge also plays a big role; typically thicker strings are more difficult to bend. Notable guitarists who used very heavy-gauge strings while still producing musical bends include Stevie Ray Vaughan and Peter Green.
- Bending the thinner strings can make them cut into the fingers of a beginner guitar player. Over time, guitar players who play regularly develop callouses on their fingertips, which develop into hardened skin upon healing.

=== Behind-the-nut pitch-shifting ===
Also known as "behind-the-nut bending"

Pressing the string between the nut and the machine head (tuning key), causes the pitch to shift. Examples include Jimmy Page's unaccompanied solo break in Led Zeppelin's "Heartbreaker".

- Classical guitar (nylon-string): This works on the unwound strings on a classical (nylon-string) guitar, and also works better on the strings whose heads (tuning keys) are further from the nut.
- Bass guitar: works on all strings

The particular advantage of this technique is that unstopped notes can be pitch-shifted (bent).

=== Variations ===
- Several strings can be bent at once.
- Innumerable bend patterns exist: for example, straight bending of a string two semitones up, then one semitone down, then one up, then two down.

=== Sound ===
When a string is bent, the sound it creates is much smoother than would be otherwise, even using other slurred techniques such as hammer-ons, pull-offs, or finger slides. String bending on the guitar was first used in blues to mimic the smooth sound of a slide guitar. It has since become an integral part of playing lead guitar. Some masters of string bending on guitar include David Gilmour, Tony Iommi, Brian May, T-Bone Walker, B. B. King, and Eric Clapton. To facilitate his extensive string bending, Clapton used to substitute an unwound banjo string for the third string on his guitar. At that time, no set of light-gauge strings with an unwound third string was available.

Bend-release
A note is pre-bent up one semitone, then bent back, followed with a one-tone pull down and hand vibrato.

== Keyboard instruments ==
Finger vibrato is also a standard part of clavichord technique, known as Bebung.

Until the first half of the 20th century, the clavichord was the only keyboard instrument on which finger vibrato was possible. In 1928, Maurice Martenot—inspired by his experience as a cellist—invented the Ondes Martenot, which featured a keyboard that the player could rock back and forth laterally.

Other finger vibrato techniques may also be used on pressure-sensitive electronic keyboards with appropriate sounds and patches. For example, some Rodgers digital church organs have an optional voice for the upper keyboard that provides a solo trumpet with velocity-sensitive volume and pressure-sensitive pitch, so a skilled player can play a realistic trumpet solo. Some 2010s and 2020s MIDI controllers and synthesizer keyboards have pressure or aftertouch sensors which sense if the player is continuing to press down a key after the initial striking; on some synth module patches (sounds), continued pressure on a key triggers an electronic vibrato effect, in imitation of the expressive vocal, bowed strings, or wind technique of adding vibrato to a held note.

On accordion, vibrato-type effects can be produced using movements of the bellows, changes in bellows pressure, or by rocking the fingers on a key.

== Wind instruments ==
Finger vibrato is used on several woodwind instruments, in both classical and traditional music. In Baroque music, it was called flattement in French and used, usually on long notes, on the Baroque flute and recorder, and noted in the writings of Jacques-Martin Hotteterre and Michel Corrette. In Irish music, it is used on the uilleann pipes and pennywhistle. In contemporary terms this technique is more usually referred to as a "timbral trill".

== See also ==
- List of ornaments
- Glissando
