= Korg Sigma =

Monophonic analogue synthesizer

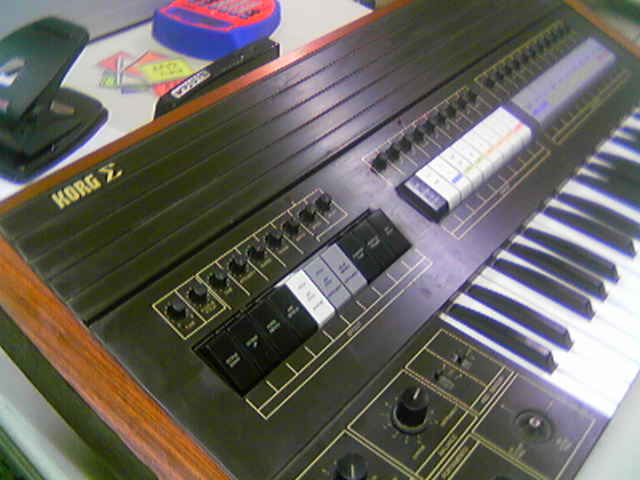
- Manufacturer: Korg
- Dates: 1979

Technical specifications
- Polyphony: Monophonic
- Timbrality: 2 part
- Oscillator: 2 VCO (SYNTHE & INSTRUMENT)
- LFO: Yes
- Synthesis type: analog subtractive
- Filter: 12-db high- and low-pass
- Aftertouch expression: yes
- Velocity expression: no
- Storage memory: 11 instrument sounds, 8 synth sounds

Input/output
- Keyboard: 37 keys
- Left-hand control: two joysticks

The Korg Sigma KP-30 is a monophonic analog synthesizer released by Korg in 1979. The Sigma was designed for organ players and live performance, featuring a user-friendly layout for quick sound selection and editing as well as two modulation joysticks and an aftertouch-sensitive keyboard. It features two separate synthesizer engines called Synthe and Instrument which can be mixed and layered together.

The Sigma was released alongside the Korg Delta, a hybrid string machine and polysynth, and the Lambda ES50, a preset keyboard that combined string and piano voices. It was used by Rick Wakeman, who substituted his Minimoogs with four Sigmas, as well as by Keith Emerson.

== Sounds and features ==
The Sigma is a preset synthesizer with two independent sections: 'Synthe' and 'Instruments,' which are mixed at the output stage and also feature separate audio outputs. Preset sounds are chosen using organ-style switches, with 11 grey switches for Instruments on the right side of the front panel and eight white switches for the Synthe section in the centre. Each switch is paired with a single knob that adjusts a specific parameter for its corresponding sound.

The 11 Instrument presets are arranged by pitch and span from a 32' Electric Bass to a 4' Hammered Percussion, each with adjustable parameters like Tone, Filter Cutoff, Attack, Decay, or Pulse Width, tailored to the specific preset. The Synthe section features waveforms including sawtooth and pulse waves across multiple octaves, complemented by envelope controls for decay on certain waves and combined attack and release on others. It features a pulse wave with pulse-width modulation (PWM) as well as a white noise generator with adjustable attack and release times. Both Synthe and Instrument signals can feed into a ring modulator to create metallic sounds, and the Synthe can be detuned relative to the Instrument section to create subtle chorusing. Multiple presets can be activated at once, enhancing presets that may seem weak individually by combining them for a fuller sound.

The Sigma features two joysticks for modulation control: the left joystick adjusts LFO modulation (vibrato), noise modulation, and pitch bend. The right joystick controls the Sigma's high- and low-pass filter cutoff frequencies, with low-pass modulation from left to right and high-pass from front to back. The keyboard's aftertouch capability also allows for pitch bend and vibrato control, with customizable sensitivity and bend direction as well as the ability to modulate the Instrument or Synthe sounds separately.

== Software ==
In 2017, Full Bucket Music released Stigma, a free digital emulation of the Korg Sigma, enhanced with modern capabilities including 64-voice polyphony, a chorus effect and preset management.
