= LinnDrum Midistudio =

Drum machine

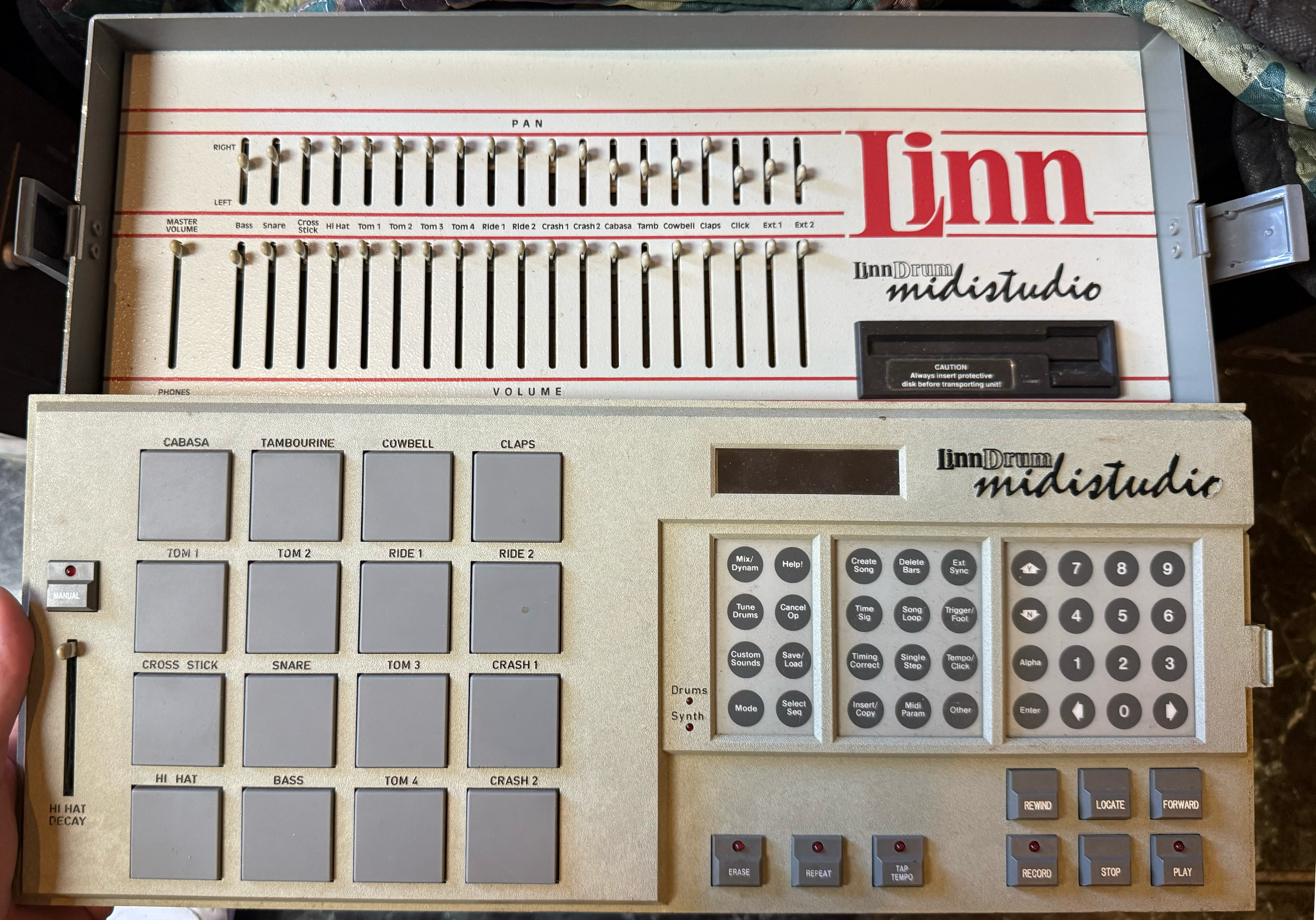
- LinnDrum Midistudio integrated digital drum machine and MIDI keyboard recorder.
- Manufacturer: Linn Electronics
- Dates: 1986
- Price: US $5,990

Technical specifications
- Polyphony: Polyphonic 13 voices
- Timbrality: Multitimbral 16 voices
- Synthesis type: 8 bit Digital Samples / 10 kHz - 50kHz
- Storage memory: 50 Drum Sequences, 50 MIDI Sequences - 10,490 notes
- Effects: Individual level, pan, tuning for all sounds

Input/output
- Keyboard: 16 large (1.25 inch square) velocity and pressure sensitive rubber pads
- External control: MIDI In/Out/Thru, Foot Switch x2, Foot Controller x1 (hi-hat), Sync Tone In/Out, trigger outputs x2, trigger inputs x16

The LinnDrum Midistudio was going to be an electronic musical instrument produced by Linn Electronics as the successor to the ill-fated Linn 9000, which was an integrated digital sampling drum machine and MIDI sequencer. The Midistudio is essentially a rack-mount version of the Linn 9000 with some improvements. It was revealed at the 1986 Winter NAMM Show in January for a list price of $5,990. However, it never went into production because Linn Electronics went out of business in February 1986.

Roughly six LinnDrum Midistudios were produced, with at least two of them being rendered non-operable due to battery leakage.

== History ==
The LinnDrum Midistudio and the LinnSequencer used the same flawed operating system used in the ill-fated Linn 9000, released in 1984. Chronic software bugs led to a reputation for unreliability and contributed to the eventual demise of Linn Electronics.

The similarities between the LinnDrum Midistudio and the Akai MPC series, starting with the Akai MPC60, leads many to perceive a family resemblance. From a strictly chronological standpoint, the LinnDrum Midistudio did come after the Linn 9000 and before the Akai MPC60 and might well be called a step in the evolution of the Music Production Centers of today.

== Features ==
The LinnDrum Midistudio has sixteen 8-bit, 10 kHz–50 kHz digitally sampled drum sounds: bass, snare, cross stick, hi-hat, two crash cymbals, two ride cymbals, four toms, cabasa, tambourine, cowbell, and clap. The Midistudio has virtually all the same features as the Linn 9000. In addition, many optional 9000 features (such as digital sampling capability and a floppy disk drive) are standard on the Midistudio.

Both machines have large (1.25-inch square) velocity- and pressure-sensitive rubber performance pads. However, the 9000 has 18 pads arranged in a three-high by six-wide pattern, whereas the Midistudio has 16 pads in a distinctive four-by-four layout. This configuration would later become the hallmark of the Akai MPC series of Music Production Centers, beginning with the Akai MPC60.

The Midistudio includes several improvements, such as a higher sampling rate of 10 kHz–50 kHz (compared to 11 kHz–37 kHz on the 9000) and support for up to 16 trigger inputs (6 standard, with an optional expansion to 12 on the 9000).

The most distinctive difference between the two machines is that the Midistudio features a rack-mountable chassis with a separate “lap pad” control panel that also serves as a protective cover for the front panel when mounted in a rack. The 9000 uses a more traditional, one-piece drum machine chassis. Both units include an onboard mixer section providing real-time control over volume and pan. On the Midistudio, the sliders are located in the rack unit, whereas on the 9000 they are integrated into the one-piece, conventional drum machine control panel.

== Brochure and gallery ==
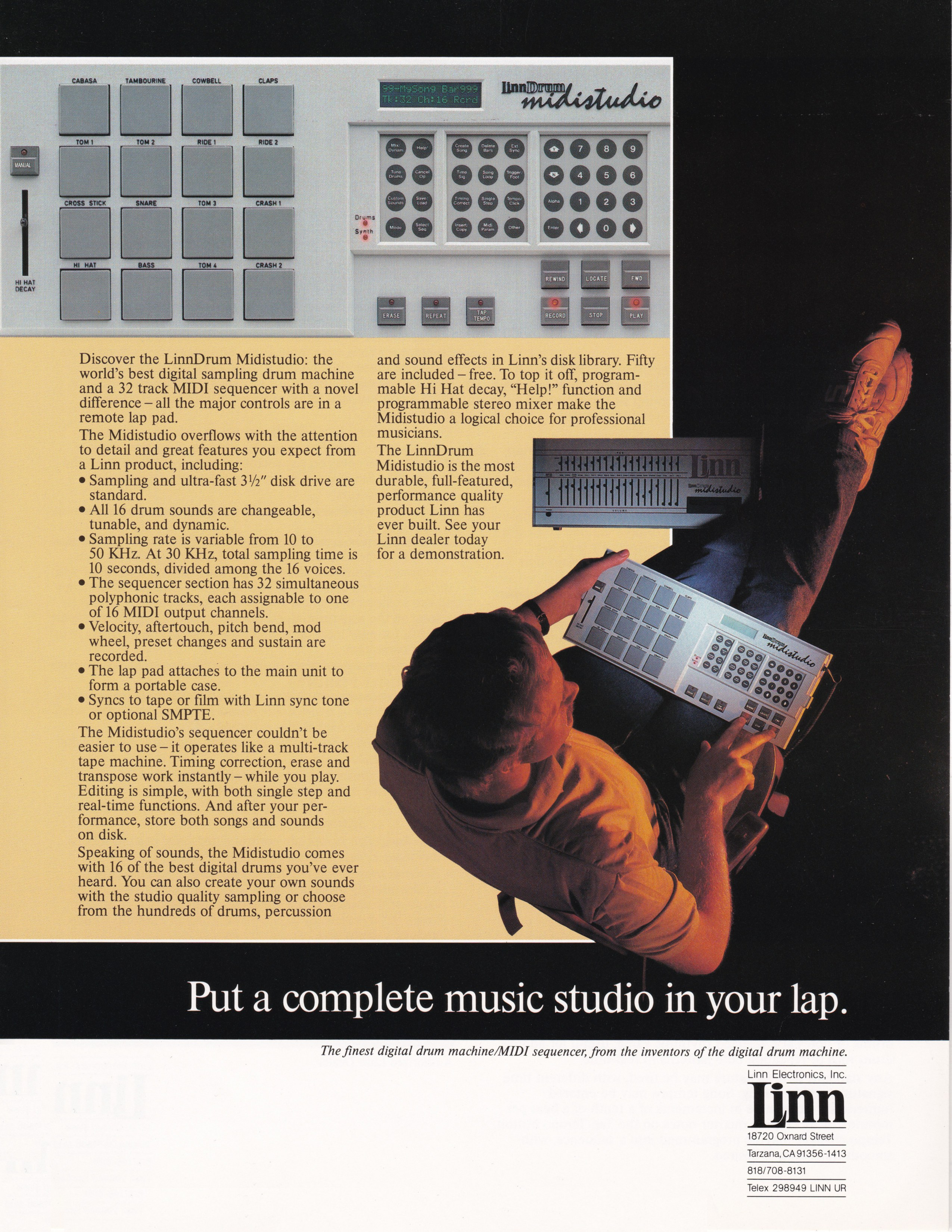
Brochure (1986) page 1

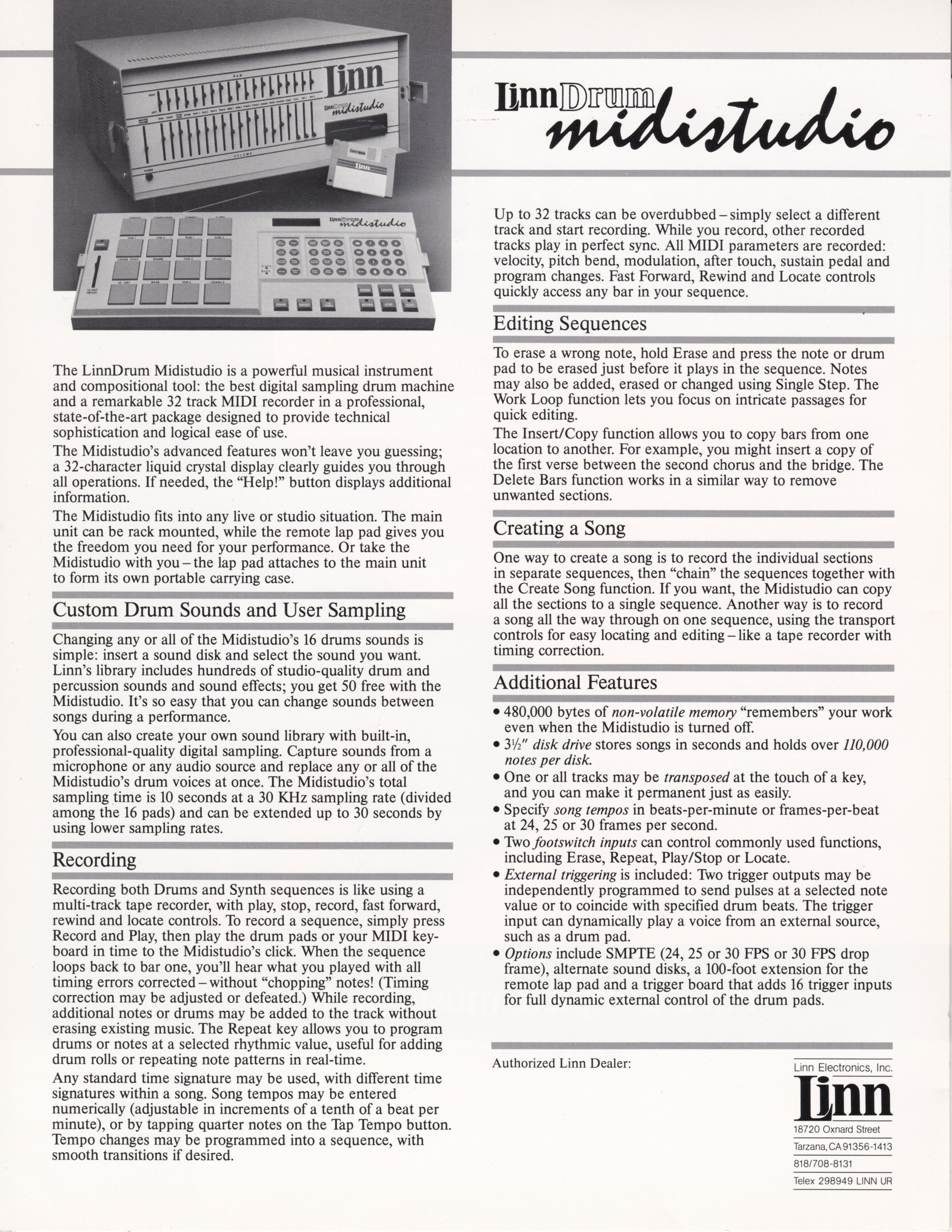
Brochure (1986) page 2

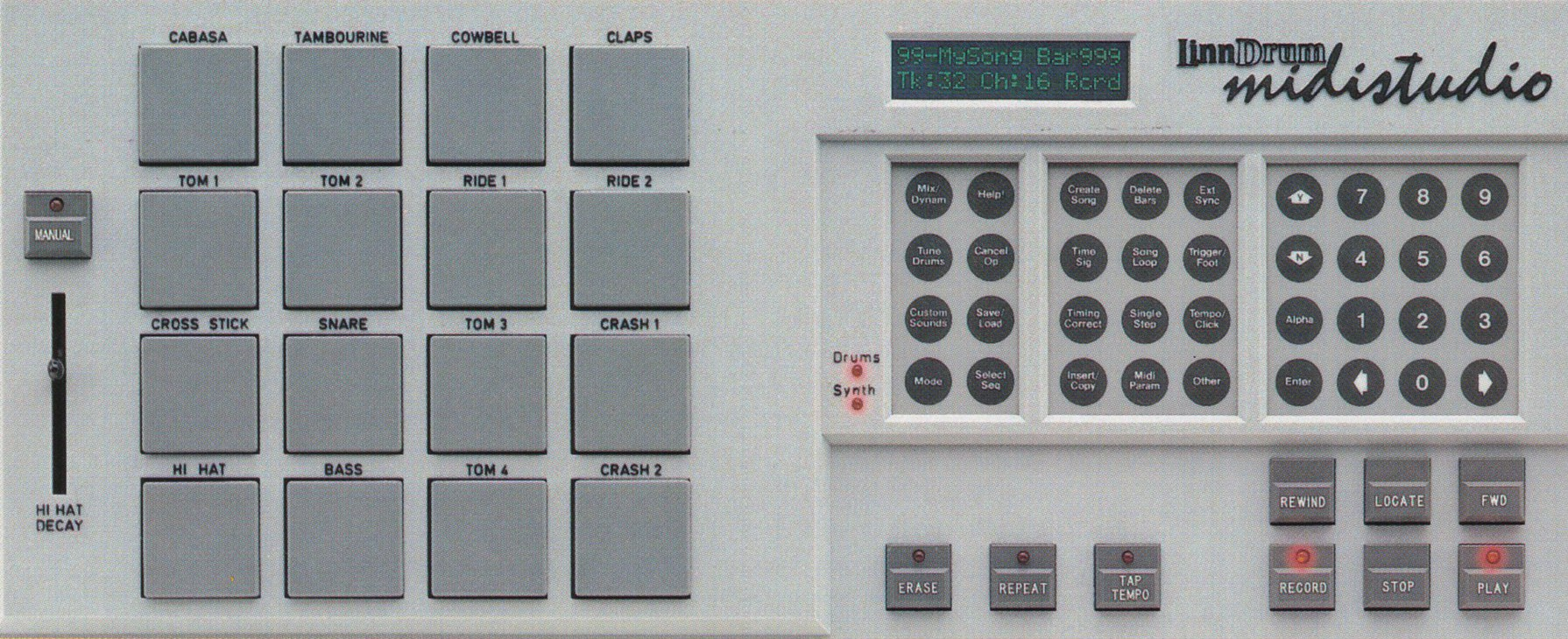
The lap pad control panel attaches to the main unit to form a portable carrying case.
