= Ceremoni =

Studio album by Kriswontwo
- Released: 14 September 2015
- Genre: Hip hop
- Length: 40:23
- Label: SomeOthaShip
- Producer: Kriswontwo

Ceremoni is the debut studio album by Danish hip hop recording artist Kriswontwo, released on 14 September 2015.

The album followed the critically acclaimed Ms. One Ep by Georgia Anne Muldrow, which Kriswontwo produced.

== Track listing ==
All tracks produced by Kriswontwo.

1. Woke (featuring Liv Lykke) – 3:27
2. Elevations (featuring Georgia Anne Muldrow, Oh No & El Da Sensei) – 3:35
3. Epiphany of Emcees (featuring MED) – 3:00
4. Focused (featuring Edgar Allen Floe & Nicholas Ryan Gant) – 2:46
5. Lost Gates (featuring MED, AB & Nicholas Ryan Gant) – 3:46
6. Get It Right (featuring Bobby Earth) – 3:40
7. Run (featuring Billow) – 3:43
8. YCBS (featuring Amalia) – 3:08
9. Love, Need You (featuring Omar) – 3:21
10. Achievements (featuring Skyzoo) – 3:15
11. Life Force (featuring Stacy Epps) – 3:46
12. Origin of Eye (featuring Nanna.B) – 3:08

== Credits ==
=== Performers ===
- Kriswontwo - all production
- Liv Lykke - vocals
- Georgia Anne Muldrow - vocals
- Oh No - rap
- El Da Sensei - rap
- MED - rap
- Edgar Allen Floe - rap
- Nicholas Ryan Gant - vocals, choir
- AB - vocals, backing vocals
- Bobby Earth - vocals
- Billow - vocals
- Amalia - vocals
- Omar - vocals
- Skyzoo - rap
- Stacy Epps - vocals
- Nanna.B - vocals
- Alexander Kraglund - violin
- Buscrates - co-production (Lost Gates)
- Kay Young - backing vocals
- Peter Marott - trumpet
- Mads Mathias - saxophone
- MonoNeon - bass
- Carl Mörner - guitar
- Rasheeda Ali - flute
- Thor Madsen - guitar
- Boe Larsen - mastering
- Tokio Aoyama - artwork painting
- Juse One - graphics

=== Recording ===
- Recorded at Mill Factory, Studio C, Copenhagen
- All songs mixed by Kriswontwo at Mill Factory, Studio C, Copenhagen
- Mastered by Boe Larsen, at Mill Factory, Studio C, Copenhagen
- Executive producer: Dudley Perkins
- Co-executive producer: Georgia Anne Muldrow
