= A Place Called Fantasy =

Studio album by MonoNeon
- Released: July 27, 2017
- Genres: Avant-garde; funk
- Length: 33:11
- Producer: MonoNeon

MonoNeon chronology
A Place Called Fantasy (2017)	I Don't Care Today (Angels & Demons in Lo-Fi) (2018)

A Place Called Fantasy is a full-length album by experimental bassist/musician MonoNeon. It was recorded in 2017 and released the same year on July 27.

== Track listing ==
All tracks are written by MonoNeon, except that where noted.

No.	Title	Writer(s)	Length
1.	"A Place Called Fantasy"		3:25
2.	"Go Away U Bi*ch A$$ Mothaf*cka"		2:26
3.	"Are U Going To Love Me The Same (feat. Nina Gnewd)"	Nina Gnewd	4:06
4.	"True Happiness Happens At The End"		2:44
5.	"So U Wanna Be A Superstar"		2:40
6.	"Your Dreams Will Come True 2 U"		1:20
7.	"Ain't Nothing United About America (Live Outro Jam with Lance Lucas and Anthony Knox)"		3:54
8.	"Send Me Your Nudes (feat. Taylor Morse)"		2:18
9.	"All I Ever Wanted To Do Was Be A Mystery"		2:46
10.	"Jenny (feat. AWFM)"	AWFM (A Weirdo From Memphis)	4:16
11.	"Little Tittie Committee"		3:16

== Release and reception ==
The reviews for the album were generally positive. Elijah C. Watson from Okayplayer wrote that "the 11-track album was heavily inspired by the artist’s time with the late Prince. There’s a dreamlike atmosphere throughout the album, each track seamlessly connected by a pulsing groove that makes MonoNeon’s avant-garde funk so enjoyable."

== Personnel ==
- MonoNeon – composer, vocals, guitar, bass, keys, drum programming
- AWFM (A Weirdo From Memphis) – rapper
- Nina Gnewd – vocals
- Taylor Morse – vocals
- Lance Lucas – organ/keys (on live outro of "Ain't Nothing United About America")
- Anthony Knox – drums (on live outro of "Ain't Nothing United About America")
