= Southern Visionary =

Studio album by MonoNeon
- Released: January 6, 2013
- Recorded: 2013
- Genre: Avant-garde, Microtonal, Southern Soul
- Length: 1:18:58

Southern Visionary is a microtonal/avant-garde album by MonoNeon released January 6, 2013. The album contains twenty tracks featuring various microtonal musicians on some of the songs. The compositions on the album displays MonoNeon's unique blend of southern soul and microtonal music.

== Track listing ==
All tracks are written by Dywane Thomas, Jr.

| No. | Title | Length |
|---|---|---|
| 1. | "Micro-Orange Mound" | 3:22 |
| 2. | "Southern Visionary" | 4:16 |
| 3. | "Eddie Kang (with AM radio noise)" | 4:06 |
| 4. | "Micro-Neon Em'" | 4:32 |
| 5. | "Micro-School Walk" | 5:18 |
| 6. | "Micro-Johnnay Taylor" | 4:06 |
| 7. | "Micro-Staple Sangus" | 3:22 |
| 8. | "Micro-Dilettante" | 4:46 |
| 9. | "Elleeot Carter" | 3:22 |
| 10. | "Micro-James Carr" | 2:58 |
| 11. | "Hannah Hoch Visits Orange Mound" (feat. Jake Sherman) | 2:26 |
| 12. | "The Noise Story" (feat. Memphis School Kids) | 2:42 |
| 13. | "Micro-Memphis" | 4:36 |
| 14. | "Nude Descending a Front Porch" (feat. Melle Weijters) | 2:48 |
| 15. | "Neon Dirge" | 3:52 |
| 16. | "Nude Descending a Back Porch" (feat. Jake Sherman) | 2:48 |
| 17. | "Rene Ma Sugar Grittes" (feat. Michael Vick) | 6:08 |
| 18. | "The Noise Story" (feat. Grandma Liz) | 4:00 |
| 19. | "Der Neon Reiter" (feat. Zach Curley) | 3:24 |
| 20. | "The Noise Story" (feat. Chris, Kirby, Junior, & Lil' Curtis) | 6:06 |
