= Keyboard expression =

Keyboard instrument ability

Keyboard expression is the ability of a keyboard musical instrument to change tone or other qualities of the sound in response to velocity, pressure or other variations in how the performer depresses the keys of the musical keyboard. Expression types include:

- Velocity sensitivity—how fast the key is pressed
- Aftertouch, or pressure sensitivity — the amount of pressure on a key, once already held down
- Displacement sensitivity—distance that a key is pressed down

Keyboard instruments offer a range of expression types. Acoustic pianos, such as upright and grand pianos, are velocity-sensitive—the faster the key strike, the harder the hammer hits the strings. Baroque-style clavichords and professional synthesizers are aftertouch-sensitive—applied force on the key after the initial strike produces effects such as vibrato or swells in volume. Tracker pipe organs and some electronic organs are displacement-sensitive—partly depressing a key produces a quieter tone.

== Velocity sensitivity ==
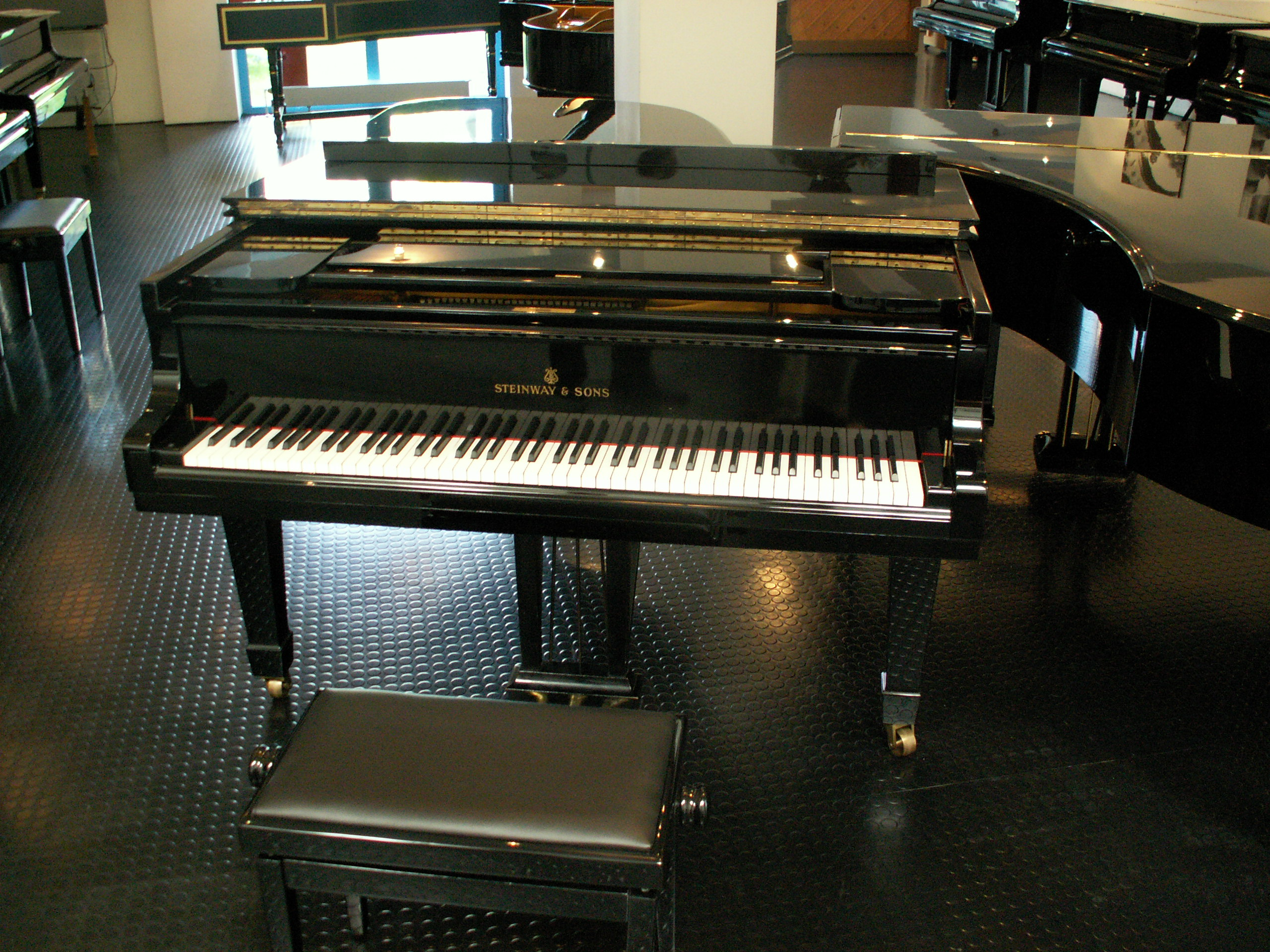
The piano is an example of a velocity-sensitive keyboard instrument.

The piano, being velocity-sensitive, responds to the speed of the key-press in how fast the hammers strike the strings, which in turn changes the tone and volume of the sound. Several piano predecessors, such as the harpsichord, were not velocity-sensitive like the piano. Some confuse pressure-sensitive with velocity-sensitive. To avoid this confusion, pressure sensitivity is often called aftertouch. The MIDI standard supports both velocity and aftertouch.

In general, only high-end electronic keyboards implement true pressure sensitivity, while most electronic keyboards support velocity sensitivity. Lower-end electronic keyboards designed for children or beginners may not have velocity sensitivity.

== Pressure sensitivity or aftertouch ==
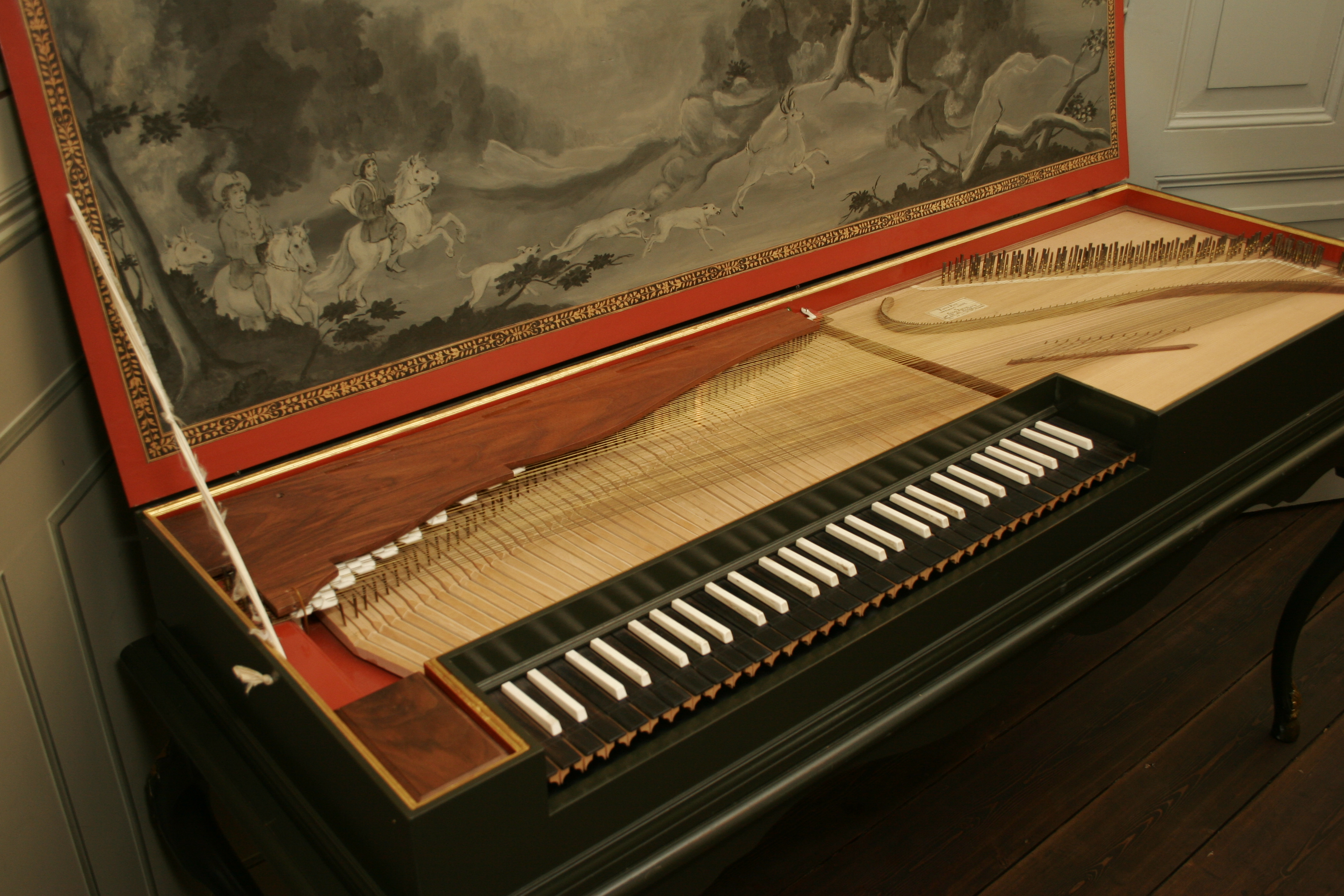
A modern reproduction of a Baroque-era clavichord

The clavichord and some electronic keyboards also respond to the amount of force applied after initial impact—they are pressure-sensitive. This can be used by a skilled clavichord player to slightly correct the intonation of the notes when playing on a clavichord, and/or to play with a form of vibrato known as bebung. Unlike in a piano action, the tangent does not rebound from the string; rather, it stays in contact with the string as long as the key is held, acting as both the nut and as the initiator of sound. The volume of the note can be changed by striking harder or softer, and the pitch can also be affected by varying the force of the tangent against the string. When the key is released, the tangent loses contact with the string and the vibration of the string is silenced by strips of damping cloth.

By applying a rocking pressure up and down the key with the finger, a performer can slightly alter the vibrating length of the string itself, producing a vibrato quality known as bebung. While the vibrato on fretless string instruments such as the violin typically oscillates in pitch both above and below the root note, clavichord bebung only produces pitches above the note. Sheet music does not often explicitly indicate bebung. Composers generally let players apply bebung at their discretion. When sheet music does indicate bebung, it appears as a series of dots above or below a note; the number of dots indicates the number of finger movements.

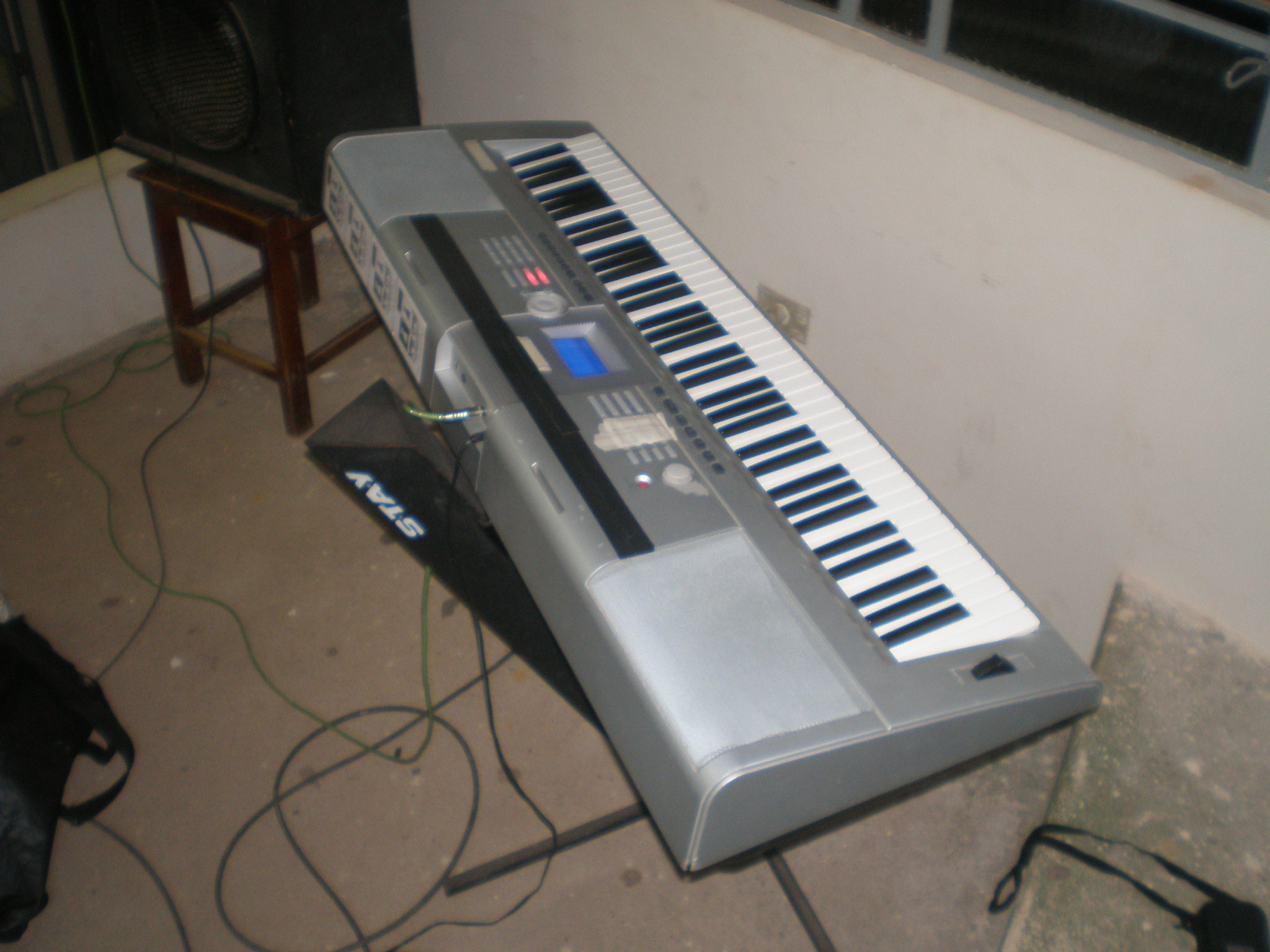
2000s-era Yamaha digital keyboard

On electronic keyboards and synthesizers, pressure sensitivity is usually called aftertouch. The vast majority of such instruments use only channel aftertouch: that is, one level of pressure is reported across the entire keyboard, which affects either all notes pressed (even ones not being pushed into aftertouch) or a subset of the active notes in some instruments that allow this level of control. A minority of instruments have polyphonic aftertouch, in which each individual note has its own sensor for pressure that enables differing usage of aftertouch for different notes.

Aftertouch sensors detect whether the musician is continuing to exert pressure after the initial strike of the key. Some aftertouch sensors also measure that pressure's intensity. The aftertouch feature allows keyboard players to change the tone or sound of a note after it is struck, the way that singers, wind players, or bowed instrument players can do. On some keyboards, sounds or synth voices have a preset pressure sensitivity effect, such as a swell in volume (mimicking a popular idiomatic style of vocal performance with melodies) or the addition of vibrato.

On some keyboards—a good example of such an instrument being Yamaha's programmable synthesiser-workstation, the Yamaha EX5—the player can select the effects to which aftertouch applies. This allows a performer to custom-tailor the effect that they desire. It may also facilitate the imitation of various non-keyboard instruments. For example, a keyboardist who wishes to imitate the sound of a heavy metal guitar solo could use a distortion guitar sound, and then set the aftertouch feature to apply a pitch bend to the note.

== Displacement sensitivity ==
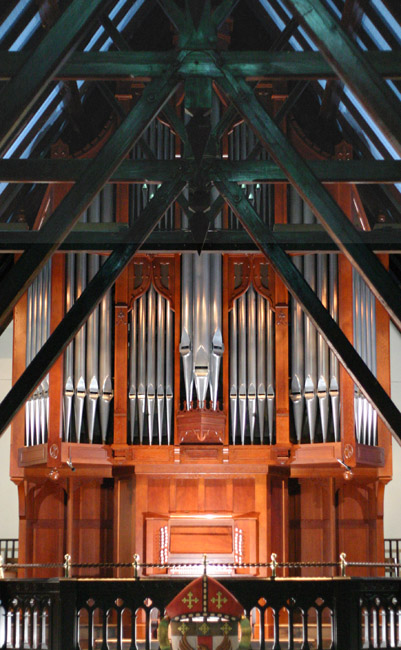
A tracker pipe organ uses a mechanical action; as such, when the keys are only partly depressed, the volume and tone are changed.

A third form of sensitivity is displacement sensitivity. Displacement-sensitive keyboards are often found on organs. Most mechanical organs, and some electrically actuated organs, are displacement-sensitive, i.e., when a key is partially pressed, the corresponding note (pipe, reed, etc.) in the organ produces a different, quieter sound than when the key is fully pressed. In some organs, the pitch or tone frequency may also be altered. Small tabletop organs and accordions often respond similarly, with sound output increasing as keys are pressed further down. Even the small circular accompaniment ("one button chord") keys found on accordions and on some organs exhibit this phenomenon. Accordingly, some electrically actuated organs have retained this form of keyboard expression — a 34-rank organ in the Swiss village of Ursy is equipped with hi-tech features from Syncordia, including what some erroneously claim is the first non-mechanical action that directly controls the opening of a pipe organ's pallets in direct proportion to key movement, ostensibly combining the virtues of electric action with the intimate control of tracker action. However, Vincent Willis' 1884 patent Floating Lever pneumatic action also had this capability.

Other more sophisticated sensitivity forms are common in organ keyboards. Both the Pratt Reed and Kimber Allen 61-key (5-octave) keyboards have provision for up to nine rails so they can sense various amounts of displacement, as well as velocity in various regimes of distance from the top to the bottom of the key travel of each key. Some modern instruments, such as the Continuum, a MIDI controller for keyboards, have extremely sophisticated human interface schemes that provide dynamic control in three dimensions. In principle, displacement can be differentiated to get velocity, but the converse is not entirely practical, without some amount of baseline drift. Thus a displacement sensing keyboard may be better at providing both organ and piano feel in a single keyboard controller.

Most digital pianos implement a displacement-sensitive keyboard, in order to simulate the sound-stopping length of the note after the key is released. On an acoustic piano, releasing a key after being partially depressed will result in a quieter, shorter sound stopping. The displacement-sensitive keyboard on a digital piano were designed to simulate the similar effect.

== Other types ==
Acoustic pianos have expression pedals that change the response or tone of the instrument.

On small upright pianos, the soft pedal (also called una corda or half-blow pedal) moves the hammers closer to the strings. On grand pianos, the soft pedal moves the hammers sideways so each hammer strikes only part of its string group.

The sustain pedal (also called damper pedal) prevents individual key dampers from lifting when the player releases the key. All notes played with the sustain pedal ring until the player releases the sustain pedal (or until the note completely decays). With the dampers not applied, octave, fifth, and other overtones vibrate sympathetically, producing a richer sound. Most electronic keyboards also have a sustain pedal that holds notes and chords, but only high-end digital keyboards reproduce the sympathetic vibration effect.

Electromechanical keyboards and electronic keyboards offer a range of other expression devices. Electromechanical keyboards such as the Hammond organ offer additional means of keyboard expression by modifying the starting, stopping, or speed of the rotating Leslie speaker or by engaging a variety of vibrato or chorus effects. Digital "clones" of Hammond organs offer recreations of these effects, along with other effects. The VK-9 digital organ, for example, offers a proximity-sensitive detector that triggers the Leslie speaker, a ring modulator, or other effects.

Some effect pedals used with electromechanical keyboards such as the Fender Rhodes electric piano or digital keyboards respond to loudness and so, indirectly, to key velocity. Examples include overdrive pedals, which produce a clean sound for softer notes, and a distortion effect for louder notes—and fixed wah-wah pedals that filter the audio signal based on loudness.
