= Kriswontwo =

- Labels: SomeOthaShip Connect

Kriswontwo is a Danish producer from Copenhagen.

Georgia Anne Muldrow said the following about him: "Kriswontwo is gifted with the ability to trust and fully follow through on his instinct; he polishes up his work with great attention to detail but he doesn't sacrifice the rawness of his original idea. It takes a whole lot of talent and discipline to be able to make that initial kneejerk reaction the centerpiece of such an elegant sound."

In 2016 a YouTube video surfaced showing Yasiin Bey (fka. Mos Def) working on lyrics to a beat by Kriswontwo.

In 2017 Dr. Dre played "Flawless (feat. Phat Kat)" from Kriswontwo's second album "Back To One" on his radio show, The Pharmacy.

== Discography ==
=== Albums ===
- Kriswontwo - Raw Beats 2013-2017 (2021)
- Kriswontwo - Back To One (2017)
- Kriswontwo - Ceremoni (2015)

=== EPs ===
- Nicholas Ryan Gant - Maze (2016)
- WEON - Neon The Won (2015)
- Georgia Anne Muldrow - Ms. One (2014)
- WEON - WEON (2013)
- Blacc El - Clap, Snap, Rock (2013)
- Nappion - Breaking Ice (2012)

=== Singles ===
- Prince Po - Here We Go (2017)
- Jallal - Break of Dawn (2016)
- Kazi feat. Bobby Earth & Nicholas Ryan Gant - Demons (2016)
- Te'Amir - Move Just (2015)
- Pede B - Lille Modelpige (2013)
- Mighty Male ft Klumben, Kidd & Skygg - Sulten (2013)
- Larry & Kay - Outskirts (2012)

=== Remixes ===
- Ida Nielsen - I Really Think Ur Cute [feat. Kuku Agami] (2017)
- Bobby Bovell - Nightwatch (2017)
- Eros feat. Jen Miller - Blind (2016)
- Kazi feat. C Keys & Dex - The Horror (2016)
- Bobby Bovell feat. Dennis Bovell - Love, Love (2016)
- Blitz The Ambassador feat. Sarkodie - Internationally Known (2014)
- Felix De Luca feat. Kay & Familia Loca - Everything Is Camouflage (2012)
