= Doobie Powell =

- Born: Hubert Leander Powell III; June 14, 1975 (age 51)
- Origin: Hartford, Connecticut, United States
- Genres: Neo-Soul, Jazz, Gospel, R&B
- Occupations: Artist (Vocalist) Musician, Producer, Minister
- Instruments: Keyboards, Vocals, Drums
- Label: ROPEADOPE/RSVP RECORDS
- Website: www.doobiepowell.com

Hubert Leander Powell III (known as Doobie Powell) is an independent neo, soul and jazz artist with gospel roots. He has worked with otherartists such as Harry Connick Jr.,Kim Burrell, The Clark Sisters, Tonex, Tye Tribbett, Kelly Price, Tramaine Hawkins and John P. Kee. He has released numerous independent albums and is the founder of Chip Off The Block Productions, LLC. He is managed by JRoberts Management.

== Biography ==
Doobie was born to Hubert Powell Jr. (Gospel Jazz great) and Jacquelyn Powell (powerhouse vocalist) in Harford, CT. His musical journey began at the age of two, influenced by the musical prowess of his parents who exposed Doobie to many genres of music.

== Albums ==
=== The Offspring (2002) ===
The Offspring is the debut album of Doobie Powell, released underground on September 21, 2002.

| Track number | Track |
|---|---|
| 1 | Intro |
| 2 | Clap Your Hands |
| 3 | Glad He Did |
| 4 | He Is |
| 5 | Fall Down |
| 6 | The Blood |
| 7 | The Drummer Side |
| 8 | Brighter Day |
| 9 | Child Of God |
| 10 | Fusion-lude |
| 11 | I Love The Lord |
| 12 | Love |
| 13 | Count Your Blessings |
| 14 | I Got Jesus |
| 15 | Give Thanks |
| 16 | Hold On |
| 17 | Dance |

=== For The Love Of It All (2003) ===
For The Love Of It All is the second album of Doobie Powell, released in 2003.

=== The Offspring (Volume 1) (2005) ===
This is the public re-release of The Offspring, Powell's album from 2002.

| Track number | Track |
|---|---|
| 1 | Intro |
| 2 | Praise Up |
| 3 | Best Thing, The |
| 4 | Leave You Alone |
| 5 | For The Love Of It All |
| 6 | Can't Imagine |
| 7 | By Faith |
| 8 | Time |
| 9 | Holy |
| 10 | Dwell In Me |
| 11 | Always Remember |
| 12 | Fall Down |
| 13 | Brighter Day |
| 14 | I Got Jesus |
| 15 | Give Thanks |

The people who worked on the album are:

- Doobie Powell: Vocals and keyboard
- Johnny DuBoise: Guitar
- Jerod Howard: Fender Rhodes piano and organ
- Kevin Powell: Organ
- Ace Livingston: Bass guitar
- Brandon Alexander Hodge: Bass guitar
- Billy Powell: Percussion
- Denise Renee Powell: Background vocals
- Courtney Williams: Background vocals

=== 4 Zoe (2007) ===
4 Zoe is the fourth album from Doobie Powell, released in 2007. It was released on Chip Off The Block records and has a runtime of 52 minutes across 12 tracks.

| Track number | Track | Length |
|---|---|---|
| 1 | I'm Back | 01:54 |
| 2 | Alright | 06:31 |
| 3 | Been So Good | 04:33 |
| 4 | Jesus | 04:57 |
| 5 | Psalms 51 and 10 | 00:48 |
| 6 | Steal Away | 06:36 |
| 7 | Victory Prelude | 01:51 |
| 8 | Victory Live | 07:16 |
| 9 | Victory High Praise | 05:49 |
| 10 | In Spite Of It All | 06:19 |
| 11 | Everybody Hold On | 02:32 |
| 12 | I'm Blessed | 03:28 |

=== The Time Is Now (2009) ===
The Time Is Now is Doobie Powell's first nationwide release and was due to be released on January 13, 2009. It was recorded at Education Center for the Arts in New Haven, CT on October 24, 2008.

== Personal life ==
Together, with the late Ebony Powell, he has a daughter, Diamond L. Powell.

Doobie is the Minister of Music at Latter Rain Christian Fellowship in Hartford, CT, where his parents are the pastors.
