= String bending =

Guitar playing technique

String bending is a guitar technique where fretted strings are displaced by application of a force by the fretting fingers in a direction perpendicular to their vibrating length. This has the net effect of increasing the pitch of a note (or notes as the case may be). String-bending allows exploration of microtonality and can be used to give a distinctive vocal articulation to lead guitar passages.

== Technique ==
String bending is executed by fretting a note on the guitar fretboard, and then applying a force perpendicular to the length of the fretboard with the fretting hand, displacing the string from its resting vibrating position. This yields a continuous increase in pitch, which can be manipulated by a skillful player to give a singing-like quality to a musical passage. The displacement of the string can be pushed "up" or pulled "down". Bending is an important component in the style of several renowned players, such as Eric Clapton, who uses copious amounts of string bending to articulate blues licks, and Buck Trent, who electrified a solid body electric banjo and implemented tuner keys and D and B benders in country music. String-bending blues-scale guitar solos were used in 1930s jazz music where it was most notably popularized by Django Reinhardt, and later rock musicians adopted the string-bending technique in the 1960s. With the advancement of steel guitars and other stringed instruments, and string bending mechanisms and playing styles, string bending is now a common technique among string players.

== Factors influencing string bending ==
There are numerous mechanical and acoustic properties which heavily influence the resultant pitch from a string bend. Analysis of the physics of string bending suggests that the resultant pitch of a string bent at its midpoint is given by

$\nu = \frac{1}{2L} \sqrt{\frac{EA + \cos\theta (T - EA)}{\mu_{o}}}$

where L is the length of the vibrating element, T is the tension of the string prior to bending, $\theta$ is the bend angle, E is the Young's Modulus of the string material, A is the string cross sectional area and $\mu_{o}$ is the linear density of the string material.

Thus, the pitch is not only dependent on the bend angle, but on material properties of the string such as Young's modulus; this may be interpreted as a measure of the stiffness of the string. The force required to bend a string at its midpoint to a given angle $\theta$ is given by

$F_{B} = 2\left(T + EA\left(\frac{1 - \cos\theta}{\cos\theta} \right) \right)\sin\theta .$

The resultant pitch from string bending is not linearly correlated with the bending angle, and so a player's experience and intuition is important for accurate pitch modulation.

== See also ==
- Finger vibrato
- Finger vibrato#Axial pitch-shifting
