= Vibrato =

Regular, pulsating change of pitch in music

Singing vibrato

Violin vibrato
The first note is played without vibrato, while the rest is played with.

Vibrato (Italian, from past participle of "vibrare", to vibrate) is a musical effect consisting of a regular, pulsating change of pitch. It is used to add expression to vocal and instrumental music. Vibrato is typically characterized in terms of two factors: the amount of pitch variation ("extent of vibrato") and the speed with which the pitch is varied ("rate of vibrato").

In singing, it can occur spontaneously through variations in the larynx. The vibrato of a string instrument and wind instrument is an imitation of that vocal function. Vibrato can also be reproduced mechanically (Leslie speaker) or electronically as an audio effect close to chorus.

== Terminology ==
=== History ===
Descriptions of what would now be characterised as vibrato go back to the 16th century. However, no evidence exists of authors using vibrato before the 19th century. Instead, authors used various descriptive terms interchangeably, including tremolo, bebung, and tremblement, and descriptions such as wavering, shake and trillo. These “terminological uncertainties” continue to pervade modern definitions of vibrato.

=== Vibrato and tremolo ===
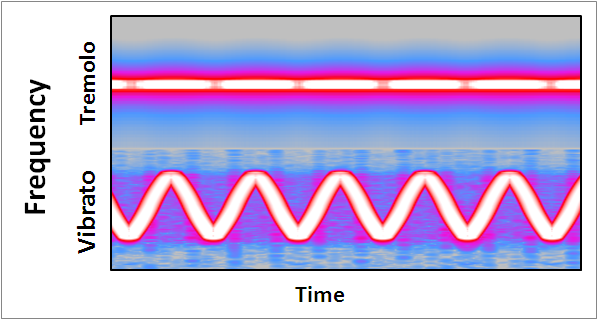
Spectrogram illustrating the difference between tremolo and vibrato, with colour corresponding to amplitude

The terms vibrato and tremolo are sometimes used interchangeably, although (in the classical world) they are properly defined as separate effects. Vibrato is defined as a periodic variation in the pitch (frequency) of a musical note that is perceived as one fundamental frequency. Tremolo, on the other hand, is defined as a fast repetition of the same note (usually a semiquaver) or alternation between two notes, especially on instruments which do not have the ability of producing long sustained notes, such as the guitar (for instance tremolo picking).

== Human perception ==
Currently, the leading understanding is that when vibrato is utilised, listeners are able to focus on the average pitch and hear it as a single fundamental as opposed to the alternation between two different fundamental frequencies. Carl Seashore (1967) conducted the first comprehensive studies on perceptions of vibrato in the context of classically trained singers, finding some individuals are 50-100 times more perceptive of the presence of vibrato than individuals with the least ability and that “much of the most beautiful vibrato is below the threshold for vibrato hearing and is perceived merely as tone quality.” This conclusion was confirmed by William Vennard (1967) who notes that the listener hears only the average pitch, and the fluctuation is interpreted as enhanced tonal quality.

In practice, it is difficult for a singer or musical instrument player to achieve only pitch vibrato (where only the pitch is varied), and variations in both pitch and volume will often be achieved at the same time. Electronic manipulation or generation of signals makes it easier to achieve or demonstrate pure tremolo or vibrato.

== Acoustic basis ==
The use of vibrato is intended to add warmth to a note. In the case of many string instruments the sound emitted is strongly directional, particularly at high frequencies, and the slight variations in pitch typical of vibrato playing can cause large changes in the directional patterns of the radiated sound. This can add a shimmer to the sound; with a well-made instrument it may also help a solo player to be heard more clearly when playing with a large orchestra.

This directional effect is intended to interact with the room acoustics to add interest to the sound, in much the same way as an acoustic guitarist may swing the box around on a final sustain, or the rotating baffle of a Leslie speaker will spin the sound around the room.

== Typical extent of vibrato ==
The extent of the variation in pitch during vibrato is controlled by the performer. The extent of vibrato for solo singers is usually less than a semitone (100 cents) either side of the note, while singers in a choir typically use narrower vibrato with an extent of less than a tenth of a semitone (10 cents) either side. Wind and bowed instruments generally use vibratos with an extent of less than half a semitone either side.

== Use in various musical genres ==
Vibrato is sometimes thought of as an effect added onto the note itself, but in some cases it is so fully a part of the style of the music that it can be very difficult for some performers to play without it. The jazz tenor sax player Coleman Hawkins found he had this difficulty when requested to play a passage both with and without vibrato by Leonard Bernstein when producing his record album "What is Jazz" to demonstrate the difference between the two. Despite his technique, he was unable to play without vibrato. The featured saxophonist in Benny Goodman's Orchestra, George Auld, was brought in to play the part.

Many classical musicians, especially singers and string players, have a similar problem. The violinist and teacher Leopold Auer, writing in his book Violin Playing as I Teach It (1920), advised violinists to practise playing completely without vibrato, and to stop playing for a few minutes as soon as they noticed themselves playing with vibrato in order for them to gain complete control over their technique.

=== In classical music ===
The use of vibrato in classical music is a matter of some dispute. For much of the 20th century it was used almost continuously in the performance of pieces from all eras from the Baroque onwards, especially by singers and string players.

The rise of notionally historically informed ("period") performance from the 1970s onwards has dramatically changed its use, especially in music of the Baroque and Classical eras. However, there is no actual proof that singers performed without vibrato in the baroque era. Notably, composer Lodovico Zacconi advocated that vibrato "ought always to be used".

Vocal music of the renaissance is almost never sung with vibrato as a rule, and it seems unlikely it ever was; however, it should be understood that "vibrato" occurs over a wide range of intensities: slow, fast, wide, and narrow. Most sources in condemning the practice seem to be referring to a wide, slow, perceptible oscillation in pitch, usually associated with intense emotion, whereas the ideal for modern vibrato, and possibly in earlier times as well, was to imitate the natural timbre of the adult singing voice, from which a measure of vibrato (it has since been shown) is rarely absent.

Leopold Mozart’s Versuch einer gründlichen Violinschule (1756), for example, provides an indication of the state of vibrato in string playing at the end of the baroque period. In it, he concedes that “there are performers who tremble consistently on each note as if they had the permanent fever”, condemning the practice, and suggesting instead that vibrato should be used only on sustained notes and at the ends of phrases when used as an ornament. This however, does not give anything more than an indication of Mozart's own personal taste, based on the fact that he was an educated late Rococo/Classical composer. Mozart acknowledges the difference between the heavy, ornamental vibrato that he finds objectionable, and a more continuous application of the technique less obtrusively for purposes of improving tone quality (in which case he does not refer to it as "vibrato" or "tremolo" at all; describing it as merely an aspect of correct fingering). In this respect he resembles his contemporary, Francesco Geminiani, who advocated using vibrato "as frequently as possible" on short notes for this purpose. Although there is no aural proof, as audio recordings were not around for more than 150 years, that string players in Europe did not use vibrato, its overuse was almost universally condemned by the leading musical authorities of the day.

Certain types of vibrato, then, were seen as an ornament, but this does not mean that it was used sparingly. In wind playing too, it seems that vibrato in music up to the 20th century was seen as an ornament to be used selectively. Martin Agricola writing in his Musica instrumentalis deudsch (1529) writes of vibrato in this way. Occasionally, composers up to the baroque period indicated vibrato with a wavy line in the sheet music. Again, this does not suggest that it was not desired for the rest of the piece any more than the infrequent use of the term in 20th-century works suggests that it is not used elsewhere.

==== Vibrato wars ====
Music by late-Romantic composers such as Richard Wagner and Johannes Brahms is now played with a fairly continuous vibrato. However, some musicians specialising in historically informed performances, such as the late conductor Roger Norrington, argue that it is unlikely that Brahms, Wagner, and their contemporaries would have expected it to be played in this way. This view has caused considerable controversy. The view that continuous vibrato was invented by Fritz Kreisler and some of his colleagues is held to be shown by early sound recordings, which allegedly demonstrate that this profuse use of vibrato appeared only in the 20th century.

The alleged growth of vibrato in 20th-century orchestral playing was traced by Norrington by studying early audio recordings but his opponents contend that his interpretations are not supported by the actual samples. Norrington asserted that vibrato in the earliest recordings is used only selectively, as an expressive device; the Berlin Philharmonic Orchestra were not recorded using vibrato comparable to modern vibrato until 1935, and the Vienna Philharmonic Orchestra not until 1940. French orchestras seem to have played with continuous vibrato somewhat earlier, from the 1920s.

Defenders of vibrato claim that the sonic limitations of 78-rpm recordings, particularly with respect to overtones and high frequency information, make an uncontroversial assessment of earlier playing techniques difficult (although, it must be said, early recordings of operatic singers manage to show clearly the extent to which a vibrato is present [or not] in their voices). Moreover, defenders of vibrato maintain that a distinction needs to be made between the kind of vibrato used by a solo player and the sectional vibrato of an entire string ensemble, which cannot be heard as a uniform quantity as such, but rather, it manifests itself in terms of the warmth and amplitude of the sound produced, as opposed to a perceptible wavering of pitch. The fact that, as early as the 1880s, composers such as Richard Strauss (in his tone poems "Don Juan" and "Death and Transfiguration") as well as Camille Saint-Saëns (Symphony No. 3 "Organ") asked string players to perform certain passages "without expression" or "without nuance" somewhat suggests the general use of vibrato within the orchestra as a matter of course; by the same token, indications by Mahler and Debussy that specifically demand the use of vibrato in certain passages may suggest the opposite practice.

==== In Baroque music ====
On the clavichord, tremolo (bebung) refers to a vibrato effect created by varying the depression of the keys.

Theorists and authors of treatises on instrumental technique of the era regularly used tremolo or bebung to refer to vibrato on other instruments and in the voice; however, there was not uniform agreement in what the term meant.

Some influential authors such as Matteson and Hiller believed the natural trembling in the voice occurred "without making it higher or lower". This could be achieved on string instruments by varying the speed of the bow, waving the hand, or rolling the bow in the fingers. On the organ, a similar effect is created by the tremulant. (Contradictory to his description, Hiller recommended string players vary the pitch by rolling the fingers to create the effect).

Other authors seem to differentiate by degrees. Leopold Mozart includes tremolo in chapter 11 of his violin treatise, but describes an unnamed vibrato technique in chapter 5 on tone production. His son, Wolfgang Amadeus Mozart, appears to take the exact opposite definition as his father: in a letter to his father, Mozart criticizes singers for "pulsing" their voice beyond the natural fluctuation of the voice, the latter of which being pleasant should be imitated on the violin, winds, and clavichord (with bebung).

To other authors such as Tartini, Zacconi, and Bremner (student of Geminiani), there is no distinction between the two.

Flute treatises of the era describe a variety of techniques for flattement as well as vibrato by shaking the flute with pitch fluctuations varying from nearly nothing to very large.

==== In opera ====
All human voices can produce vibrato. This vibrato can be varied in width (and rapidity) through training. In opera, as opposed to pop, vibrato begins at the start of the note and continues to the end of the note with slight variations in width during the note.

Traditionally, however, the deliberate cultivation of a particularly wide, pervasive vibrato by opera singers from the Latin countries has been denounced by English-speaking music critics and pedagogues as a technical fault and a stylistic blot (see Scott, cited below, Volume 1, pp. 123–127). They have expected vocalists to emit a pure, steady stream of clear sound — irrespective of whether they were singing in church, on the concert platform, or on the operatic stage.

During the 19th century, for instance, New York and London based critics, including Henry Chorley, Herman Klein, and George Bernard Shaw, castigated a succession of visiting Mediterranean tenors for resorting to an excessive, constantly pulsating vibrato during their performances. Shaw called the worst offenders "goat bleaters" in his book Music in London 1890-1894 (Constable, London, 1932). Among those censured for this failing were such celebrated figures as Enrico Tamberlik, Julián Gayarre, Roberto Stagno, Italo Campanini and Ernesto Nicolini—not to mention Fernando Valero and Fernando De Lucia, whose tremulous tones are preserved on the 78-rpm discs that they made at the beginning of the 20th century.

The popularity of an exaggerated vibrato among many (but by no means all) Mediterranean tenors and singing teachers of this era has been traced back by musicologists to the influential example set by the early-19th-century virtuoso vocalist Giovanni Battista Rubini (1794–1854). Rubini had employed it with great success as an affecting device in the new Romantic operas of Gaetano Donizetti and Vincenzo Bellini. A host of young Italian tenors—including the renowned Giovanni Matteo Mario (1810–1883) — copied Rubini's trend-setting innovation in order to heighten the emotional impact of the music that they were singing, and to facilitate the delivery of fioritura "by, as it were, running up and down the vibrato" (to quote Scott; see p. 126).

Prior to the advent of the charismatic Rubini, every well-schooled opera singer had avoided using a conspicuous and continuous vibrato because, according to Scott, it varied the pitch of the note being sung to an unacceptable degree and it was considered to be an artificial contrivance arising from inadequate breath control. British and North American press commentators and singing teachers continued to subscribe to this view long after Rubini had come and gone.

Accordingly, when Enrico Caruso (1873–1921) — the most emulated Mediterranean tenor of the 20th century — made his acclaimed New York Metropolitan Opera debut in November 1903, one of the specific vocal attributes for which he was praised by music reviewers was the absence of a disruptive vibrato from his singing. The scholarly critic William James Henderson wrote in The Sun newspaper, for example, that Caruso "has a pure tenor voice and [it] is without the typical Italian bleat". Caruso's gramophone recordings support Henderson's assessment. (Other prominent Mediterranean tenors of the late 19th century to early 20th century who, like Caruso, did not "bleat" were Angelo Masini, Francesco Tamagno, Francesco Marconi, Francisco Viñas, Emilio De Marchi, Giuseppe Borgatti and Giovanni Zenatello, while the phenomenon was rare among French, German, Russian and Anglo-Saxon tenors of the same period—see Scott.)

The intentional use of a pronounced vibrato by Mediterranean tenors is a practice that has died out over the course of the past 100 years, owing in no small measure to Caruso's example. The last really important practitioners of this style and method of singing were Alessandro Bonci (in the 1900-1925 period) and Giacomo Lauri-Volpi (in the 1920-1950 period). Both of them featured bel canto works, dating from Rubini's day, in their operatic repertoires, and both of them can be heard on recordings which faithfully capture the distinct shimmer inherent in their timbre.

Italian or Spanish-trained operatic sopranos, mezzo-sopranos, and baritones exhibiting a pronounced vibrato did not escape censure, either, by British and North American arbiters of good singing. Indeed, Adelina Patti and Luisa Tetrazzini were the only Italian sopranos to enjoy star status in London and New York in the late-Victorian and Edwardian eras, while such well-known compatriots and coevals of theirs as Gemma Bellincioni and Eugenia Burzio (among several others) failed to please the Anglophones' ears because, unlike Patti and Tetrazzini, they possessed unsteady, vibrato-laden voices—see Scott for evaluations of their respective techniques. To give an additional female example from a later date, whenever the vivacious mezzo-soprano of the 1920s and '30s, Conchita Supervía, performed in London, she was admonished in print for her exceedingly vibrant and fluttery tone, which was unkindly likened by her detractors to the chatter of a machine-gun or the rattle of dice in a cup.

In 1883, Giuseppe Kaschmann (né Josip Kašman) — a principal baritone at La Scala, Milan—was criticised for his strong vibrato when he sang at the Met, and the theatre's management did not re-engage him for the following season, even though other aspects of his singing were admired. (Kaschmann never performed in Great Britain but he remained a popular artist in the Latin countries for several decades; in 1903, he made a few recordings which exhibit only too well his perpetual flutter.) Similarly, another one of Italy's leading baritones, Riccardo Stracciari, was unable to turn his pre-World War I London and New York operatic engagements into unambiguous triumphs due to an intrusive quiver in his tone. He subsequently moderated his vibrato, as the discs that he made for Columbia Records in 1917-1925 show, and this enabled him to pursue a significant career not only in his homeland but also at the Chicago opera.

There is another kind of vibrato-linked fault that can afflict the voices of operatic artists, especially aging ones—namely the slow, often irregular wobble produced when the singer's vibrato has loosened from the effects of forcing, over-parting, or the sheer wear and tear on the body caused by the stresses of a long stage career.

References: For more information about the historical employment of vibrato by classical vocalists, see Michael Scott's two-volume survey The Record of Singing (published by Duckworth, London, in 1977 and 1979); John Potter's Tenor: History of a Voice (Yale University Press, New Haven & London, 2009); and Herman Klein's 30 Years of Music in London (Century, New York, 1903).

=== In jazz ===
Most jazz players for the first half of the 20th century used vibrato more or less continuously. Since around the 1950s and the rise of bebop, continuous use of vibrato has largely fallen out of style in favor of more selective use.

=== In folk ===
Folk music singers and instrumentalists in the North American and Western European traditions rarely use vibrato, reserving it for occasional ornamentation. It also tends to be used by performers of transcriptions or reworkings of folk music that have been made by composers from a classical, music-school background such as Benjamin Britten or Percy Grainger. Vibrato of varying widths and speeds may be used in folk music traditions from other regions, such as Eastern Europe, the Balkans, the Middle East, East Asia, or India.

=== In pop ===
In pop (as opposed to opera), the vibrato usually starts somewhere in the latter part of the note. In the case of some pop balladists, the vibrato can be so wide as to constitute a pronounced wobble, although not as pronounced as that present in operatic voices. Many singers use pitch correction software in which the effect can be reduced or eliminated.

== Techniques for producing vibrato ==
Not all instruments can produce vibrato, as some have fixed pitches that cannot be varied by sufficiently small degrees. Most percussion instruments are examples of this, for instance, the xylophone.

=== Singing ===
There are three different voice vibrato processes that occur in different parts of the vocal tract. Peter-Michael Fischer has vibrato types defined by place of production:

- The vocalis muscle vibrates at a frequency of 6.5 to 8 Hz.
- The diaphragm vibrates at a frequency below 5 Hz vibrato
- A combination of the two, resulting in a vibrato whose frequency is between 5 and 6.5 Hz vibrato. Fischer writes:

"This combination is relatively stable in the most beautiful voices. An important feature is that the partial functions can appear during the song as "accents": In the context of the presentation expressive wave dominates respirativa, lyrical character, but in an accelerated, or glottis wave, hard feature heroic, but in a slow way."

— Peter-Michael Fischer.

Some studies have shown that vibrato is the result of a neuromuscular tremor in the vocal folds. In 1922, Max Schoen was the first to make the comparison of vibrato to a tremor due to the following similarities:

- Vibrato and tremors have a change in amplitude
- Both occur when the muscles are under strain
- Neither are under the automatic control of the person
- Vibrato and tremors occur at half the rate of normal muscular discharge

=== Keyboard instruments ===
Some types of organ can produce vibrato by altering the pressure of the air passing through the pipes, or by various mechanical devices (see the Hammond or Wurlitzer Organs for example). The clavichord, though technically a fixed-pitch keyboard instrument, is capable of producing a type of vibrato known as Bebung by varying the pressure on the key as the note sounds. Some digital keyboards can produce an electronic vibrato effect, either by pressure on the keys, or by using a joystick or other MIDI controller.

=== String instruments ===
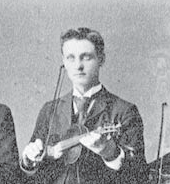
Petrowitsch Bissing was an instructor of vibrato method on the violin and published a book titled Cultivation of the Violin Vibrato Tone.

The method of producing vibrato on other instruments varies. On string instruments, for example, the finger used to stop the string can be wobbled on the fingerboard, or actually moved up and down the string for a wider vibrato.

Many contemporary string players vary the pitch from below, only up to the nominal note and not above it, although great violin pedagogues of the past such as Carl Flesch and Joseph Joachim explicitly referred to vibrato as a movement towards the bridge, meaning upwards in pitch,—and the cellist Diran Alexanian, in his 1922 treatise Traité théorique et pratique du Violoncelle, shows how one should practice vibrato as starting from the note and then moving upwards in a rhythmic motion. In a 1996 acoustic study by the Acoustical Society of America, along with Wellesley College and the Massachusetts Institute of Technology, found that the perceived pitch of a note with vibrato "is that of its mean", or the middle of the fluctuating pitch.

Vibrato played on a cello.

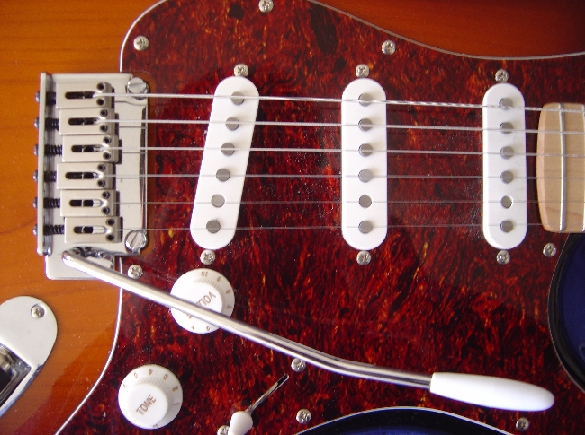
A vibrato, sometimes called whammy bar, on an electric guitar allows to lower or raise the strings in order to produce vibrato.

Wide vibrato, as wide as a whole-tone, is commonly used among electric guitar players and adds the signature vocal-like expressiveness to the sound. This effect can be achieved both by the movement of fingers on the fretboard and by the use of a vibrato tailpiece, a lever that adjusts the tension of the strings.

Some violinists, like Leonidas Kavakos, use bow vibrato by moving the right hand up and down slightly to change the angle and pressure of the bow and thus oscillate the pitch and intensity of a note. The first known description of this technique on violin was by Francesco Geminiani. This technique was not limited to violin but was known to players of all string instruments in Italy, France, Germany, and England during the Baroque era. Sylvestro Ganassi dal Fontego is known to have described this technique for the viol da gamba as early as the 16th century.

=== Woodwind ===
Players of woodwind instruments generally create vibrato by modulating their air flow into the instrument. This may be accomplished either through stomach vibrato, the pulsing of the diaphragm slightly up and down, or throat vibrato, a variation of vocal cord tension to manipulate air pressure as singers do. Players of other instruments may employ less common techniques. Although saxophonists and clarinetists can also use airflow, it is more common for them to create vibrato by repeatedly moving their jaw up and down slightly. However classical clarinetists rarely play with vibrato.

=== Brass ===
Brass instrument players can produce vibrato by repeatedly and rapidly altering the embouchure, or use and shaping of the lips and facial muscles, essentially repeatedly "bending" the note. This is called lip-vibrato, and is probably the most commonly used technique of vibrato on a lower brass instrument. It is also known to give the best sound and timbre on a brass instrument and is encouraged in upper-level or militaristic style brass ensembles.

Players may also produce vibrato by gently shaking the horn which varies the pressure of the mouthpiece against the lip. This is referred to as hand vibrato. It is more favored in higher brass, but does not possess the same sound quality as lip-vibrato and at upper levels and can be viewed as a technical mistake, most notable in military style brass training.

On a trombone, a player may provide a slightly more pronounced vibrato by gently moving the slide back and forth, centering on one note to give a lyrical effect. Often this is more of a jazz technique, and is called slide vibrato. In brass playing, diaphragmatic vibrato is possible, but is viewed as an immature technique by collegiate or professional brass players as this technique interferes with proper airflow from the lungs to the instrument. The use of diaphragmatic vibrato in a brass setting is detrimental to the sound and stamina that a brass player can produce, and so is strongly discouraged at any level of musical training.

=== Auto-vibrato ===
A vibrato effect pedal, played on electric guitar.

Some instruments can be played only with constant, mechanical vibrato (or none at all). This effect is notable in electric organists using a Leslie speaker, the most popular of which use a two-speed vibrato; a degree of expression is gained from the acceleration between speeds. Vibrato on the theremin, which is a continuously variable-pitch instrument with no "stops", can range from delicate to extravagant, and often serves to mask the small pitch adjustments that instrument requires.

Some manufacturers also build vibrato effect pedals that imitate the natural vibrato but can also produce much faster speeds. The vibrato effect is close to a chorus effect.

=== Leslie speaker ===
A Leslie speaker (best known through its historical and popular association with the Hammond organ) creates vibrato as a byproduct of tremolo production. As a Leslie speaker is moved by the rotating mechanism on which it is mounted, it moves closer to or farther away from any given object (such as a listener's ears) not also mounted on the mechanism. Because amplitude varies directly with sound pressure (A = k_{1}P) and sound pressure varies directly with distance (P = k_{2}d), such that amplitude also varies directly with distance (A = k_{1}(k_{2}d) = k_{1}k_{2}d), the amplitude of the sound as perceived by the listener will be greatest when the speaker is at the point in its rotation closest to the listener and least when the speaker is farthest away. Because the speaker is constantly moving either toward or away from the listener, however, the mechanism's rotation is constantly affecting the listener-perceived sound's wavelength by either "stretching" the wave (increasing wavelength) or "squeezing" it (decreasing wavelength) — and because frequency, i.e., pitch, is inversely proportional to wavelength, such that increasing wavelength decreases frequency and vice versa, any listener for whom the speaker's motion changes the sound's perceived amplitude (i.e., any listener whose distance from the speaker is changing) must also perceive a change in frequency.

== Sound examples ==
- Vibrato (frequency modulation) in the band from 494 Hz to 506 Hz, i.e. 500 Hz ± 6 Hz, traversing the band at 50 Hz, at constant amplitude
- Tremolo (amplitude modulation) of a 500 Hz tone at 6 Hz, at constant frequency
- Tremolo by interference of two tones, 500 and 506 Hz, each at constant amplitude, producing a beat of 6 Hz

== See also ==
- List of ornaments
- Finger vibrato
- Tremolo
- Vibrato unit
- Wah-wah (music)
