= List of sopranos in non-classical music =

Singers with the highest voice class

The soprano singing voice is the voice of children and the highest type of female voice with vocal range that typically lies between "middle C" (C_{4}) and "high C" (C_{6}) The soprano voice (unlike the mezzo-soprano voice) is stronger in the head register than the chest register, resulting in a bright and ringing tone. Some sopranos can sing one or more octaves above high C in high head voice or using the whistle register.

The term soprano was developed in relation to classical and operatic voices, where the classification is based not merely on the singer's vocal range but also on the tessitura and timbre of the voice. For classical and operatic singers, their voice type determines the roles they will sing and is a primary method of categorization. In non-classical music, singers are primarily defined by their genre and their gender not their vocal range. When the terms soprano, mezzo-soprano, contralto, tenor, baritone, and bass are used as descriptors of non-classical voices, they are applied more loosely than they would be to those of classical singers and generally refer only to the singer's perceived vocal range.

The following is a list of singers in country, popular music, jazz, classical crossover, and musical theatre who have been described as sopranos.

== List of names ==
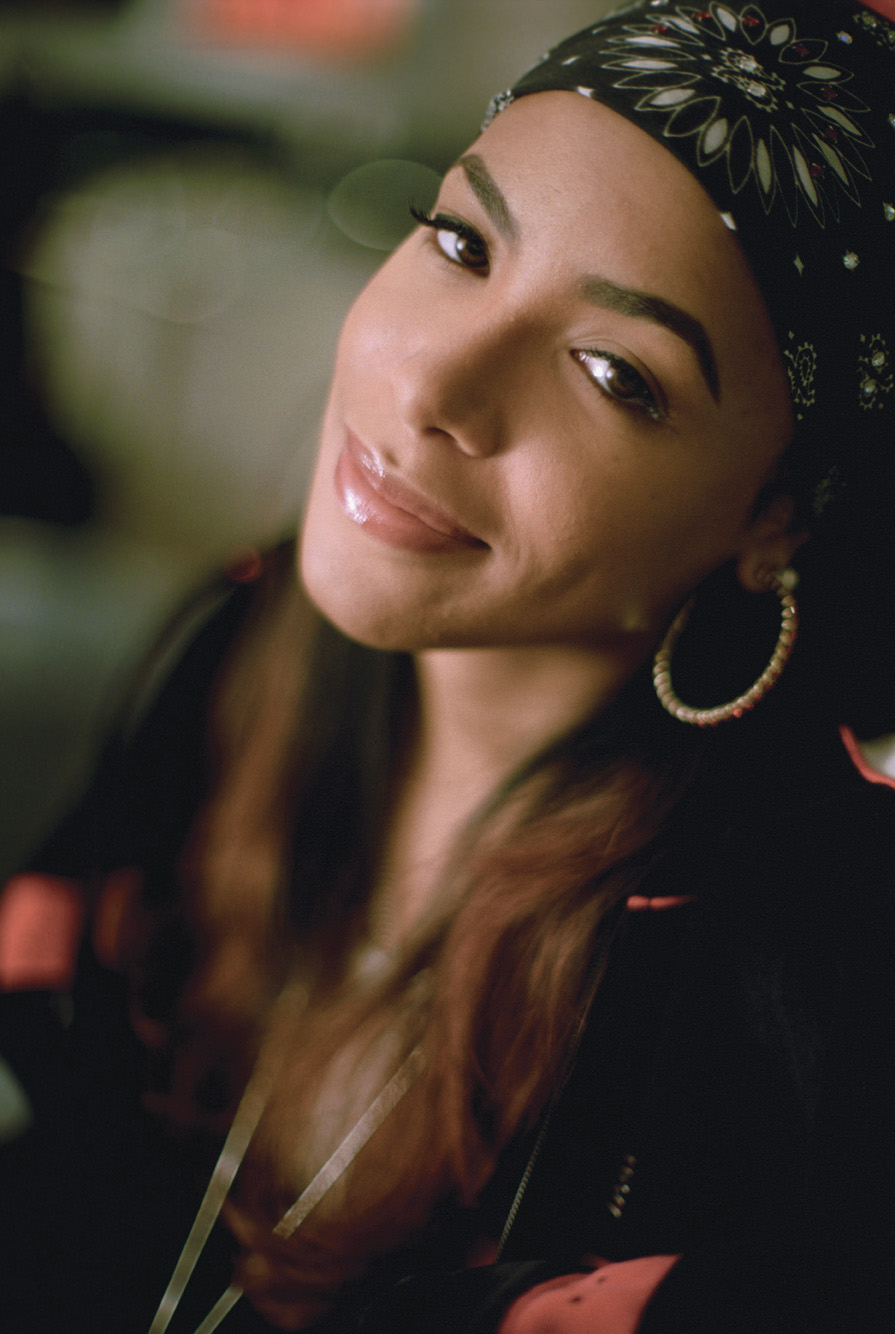
Aaliyah

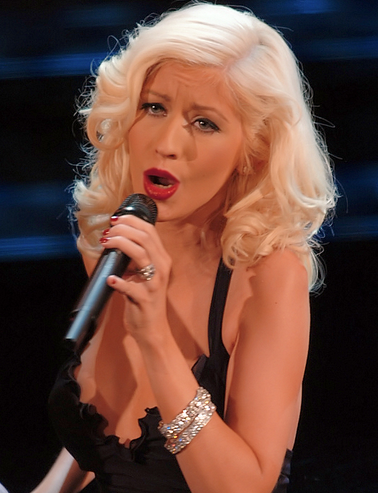
Christina Aguilera

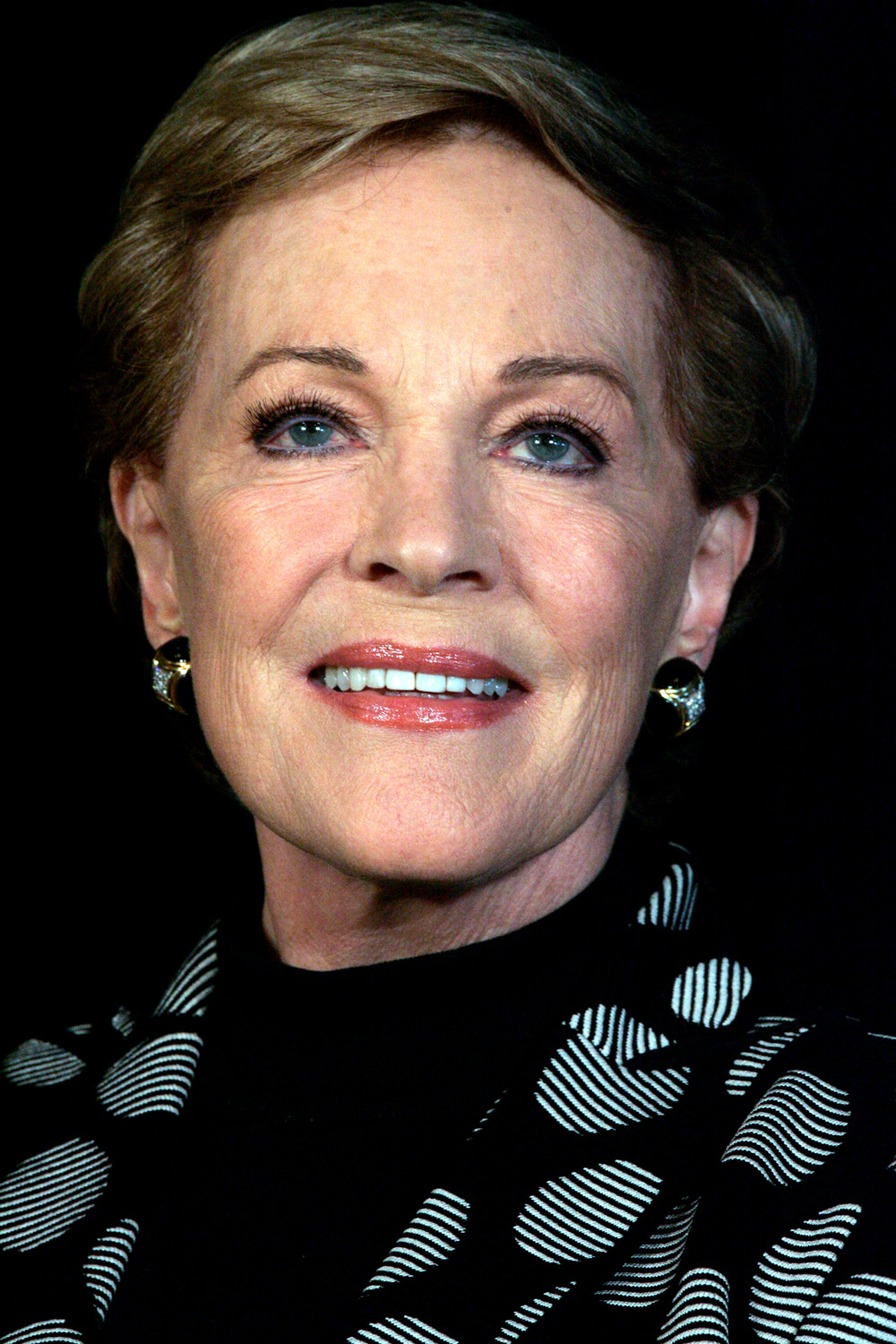
Julie Andrews

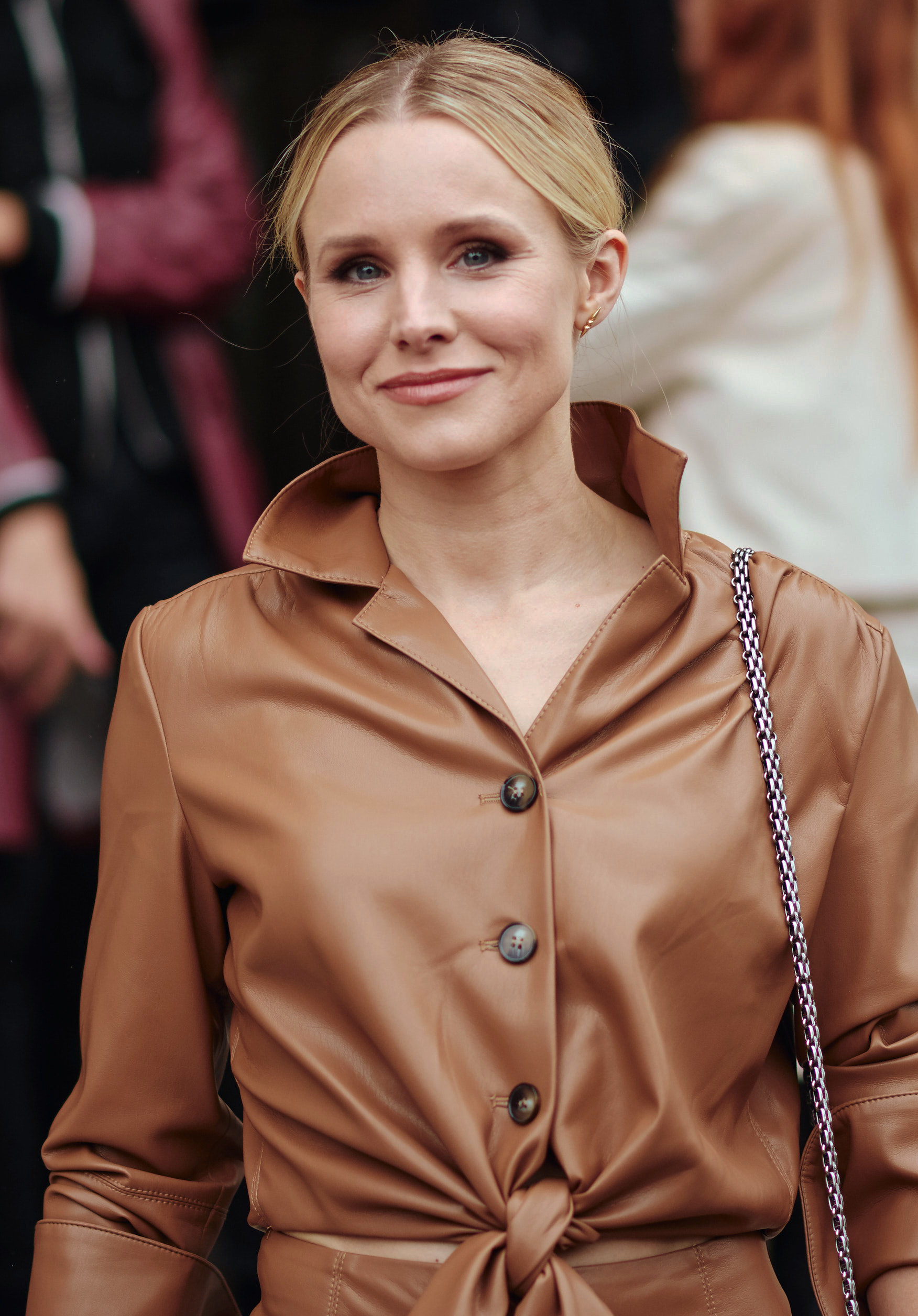
Kristen Bell

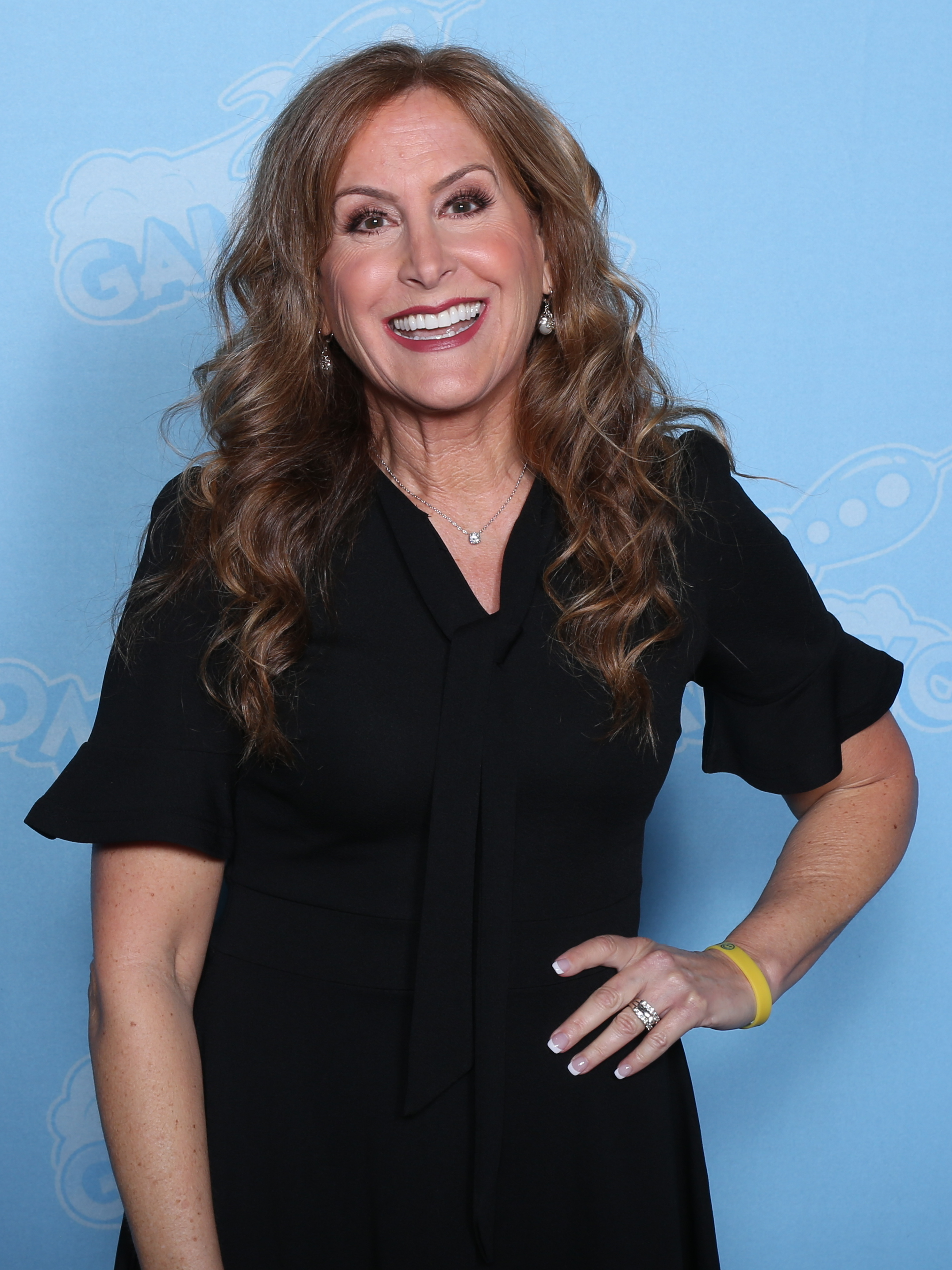
Jodi Benson

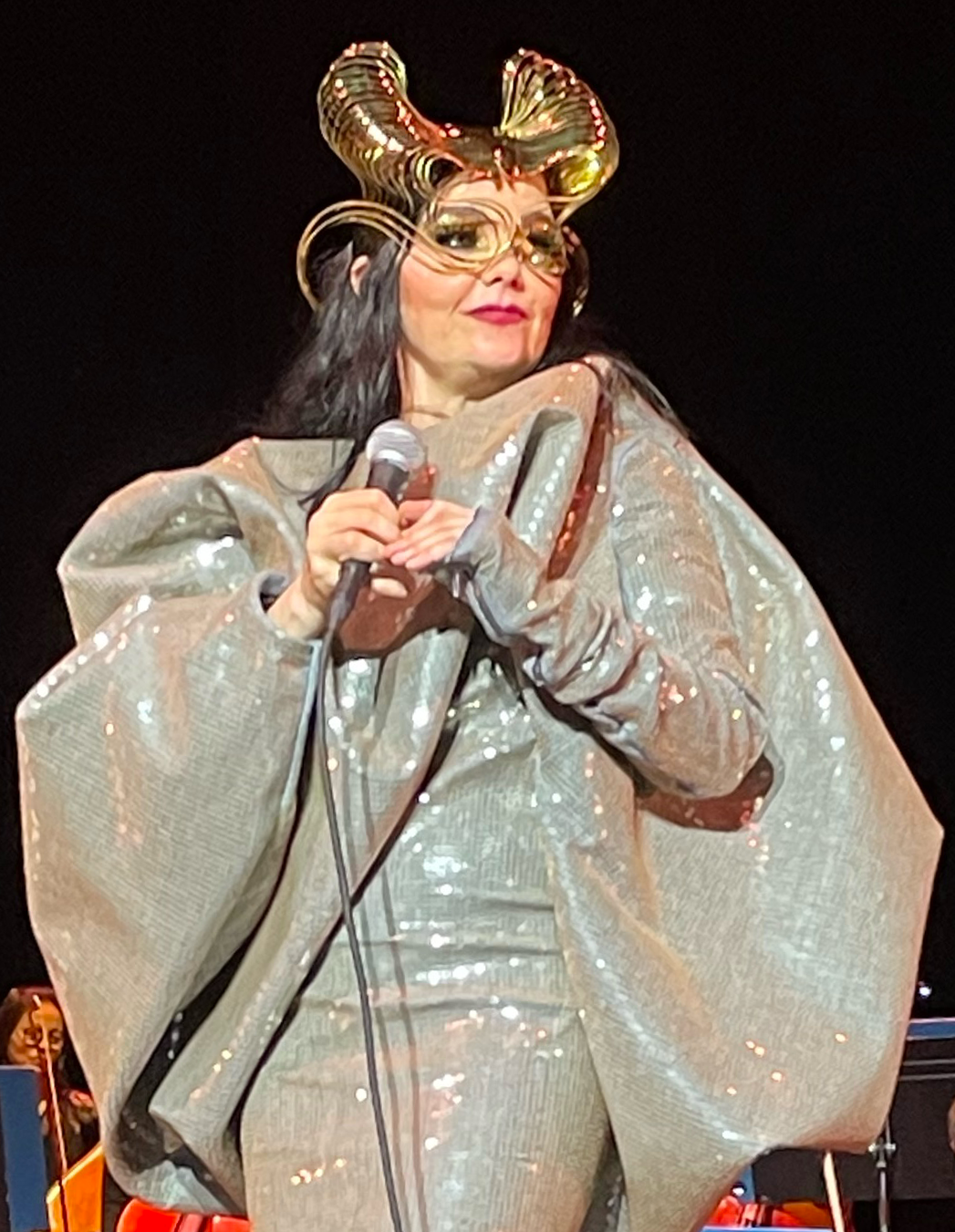
Björk

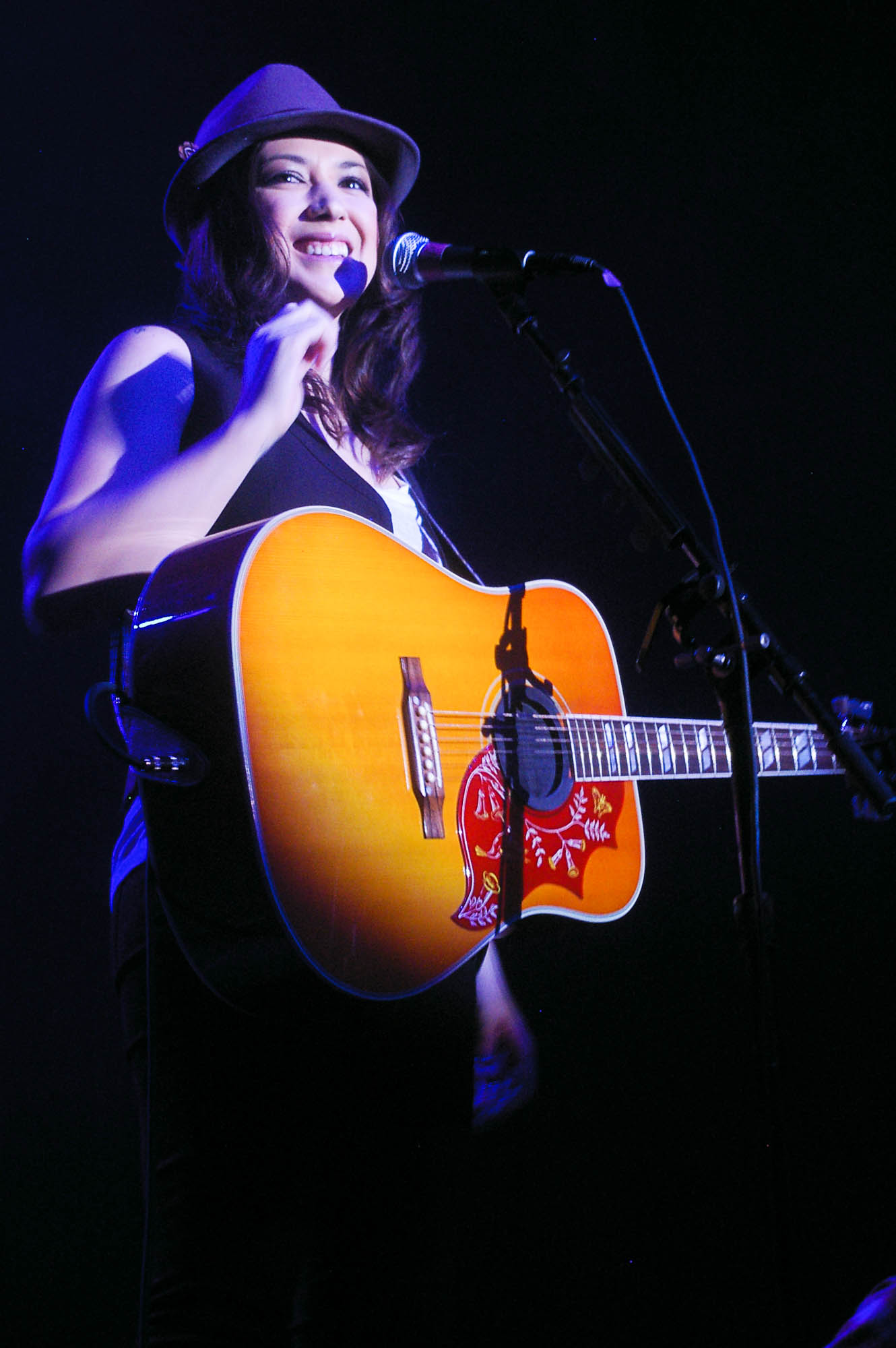
Michelle Branch

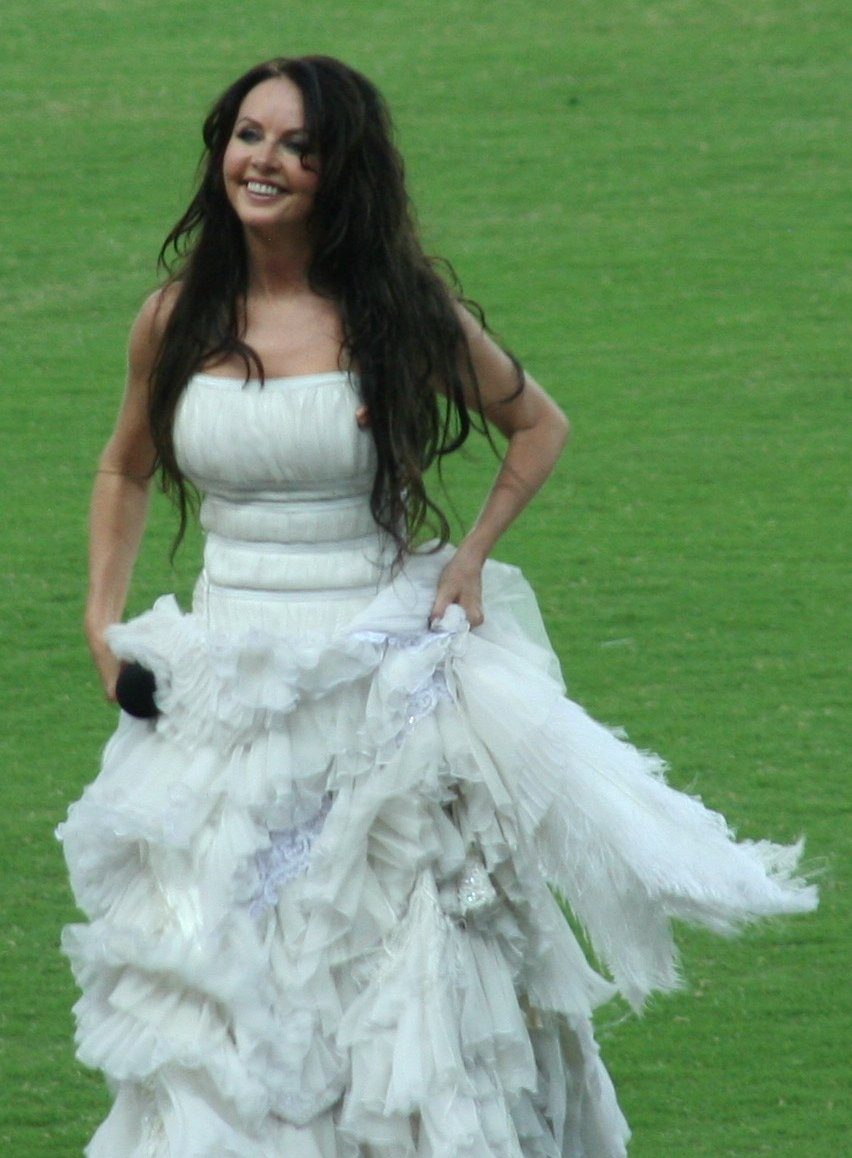
Sarah Brightman

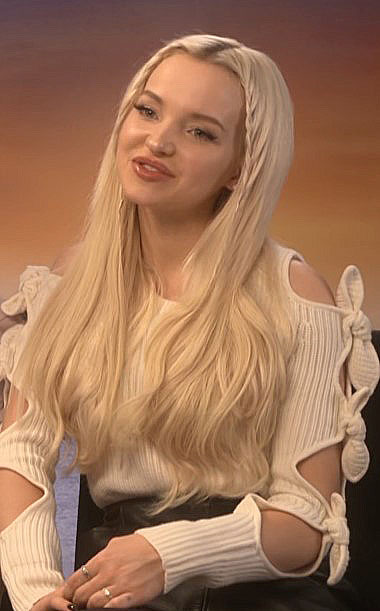
Dove Cameron

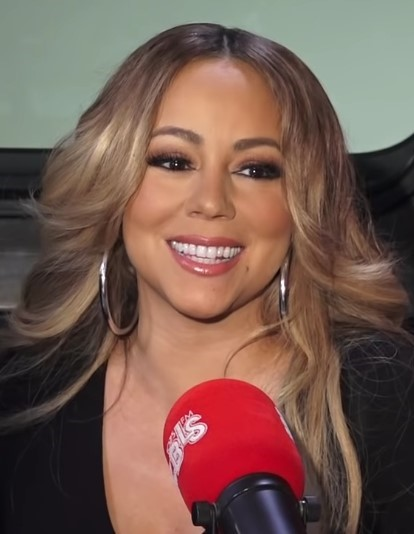
Mariah Carey

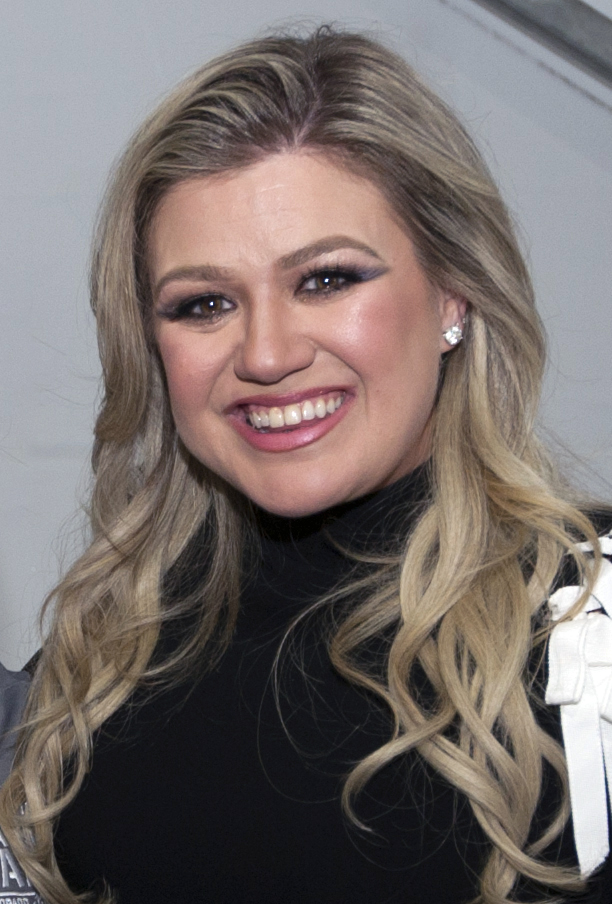
Kelly Clarkson

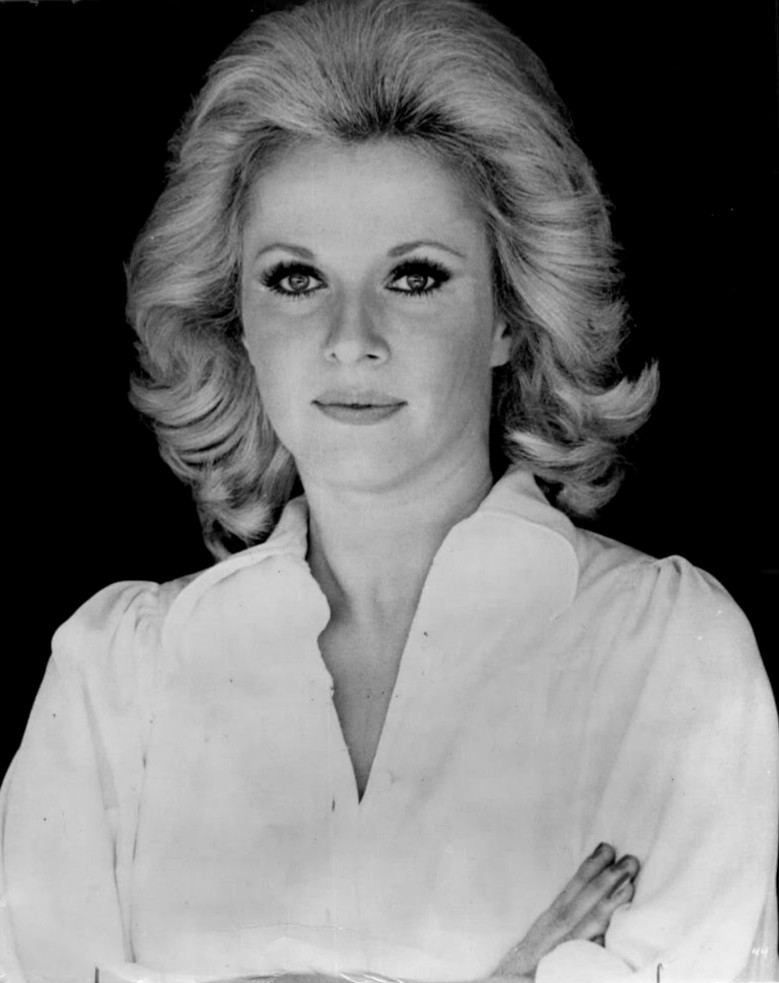
Mary Costa

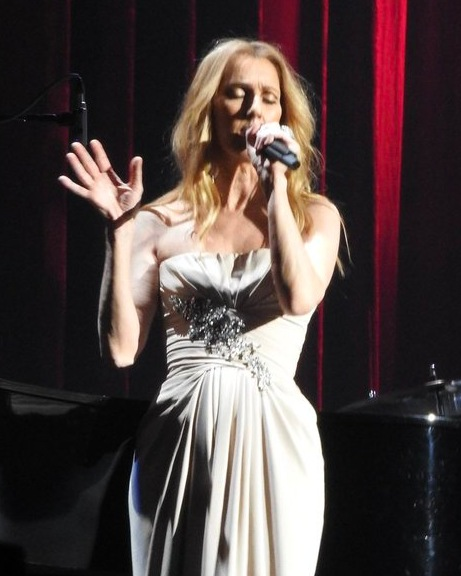
Celine Dion

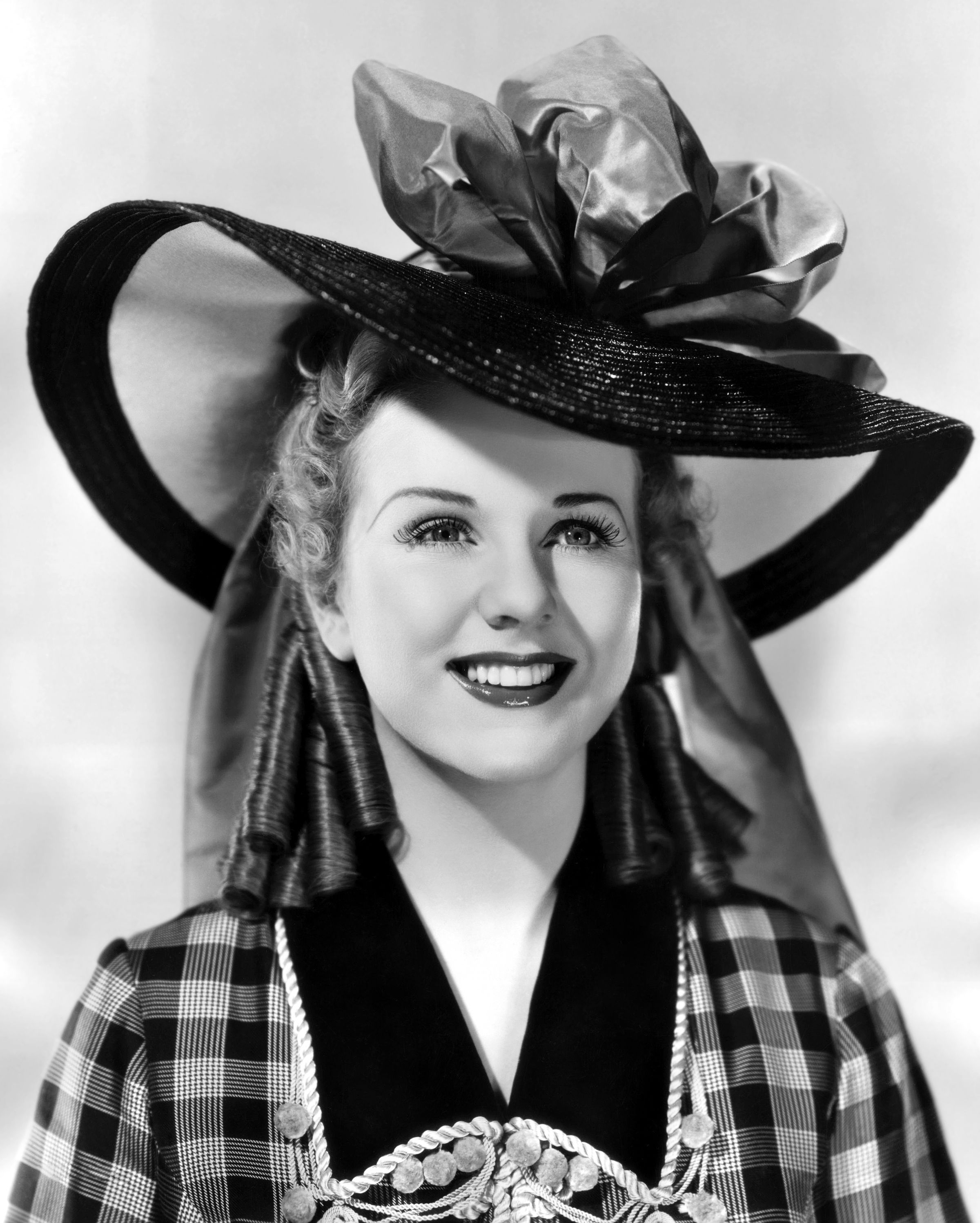
Deanna Durbin

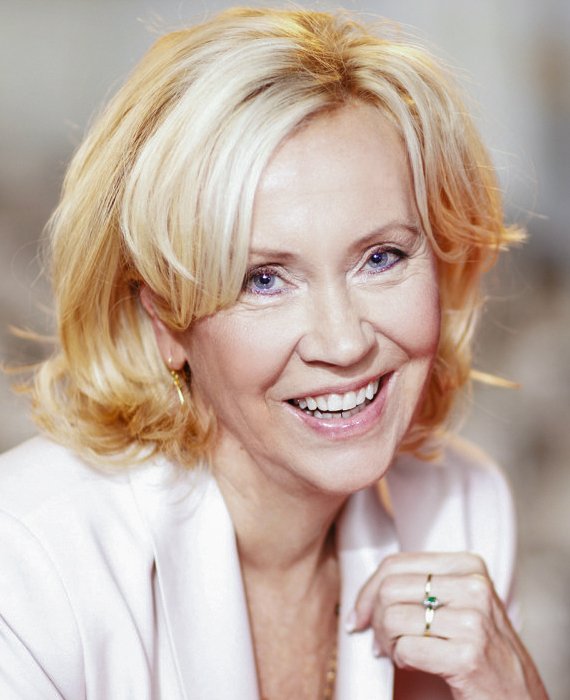
Agnetha Fältskog

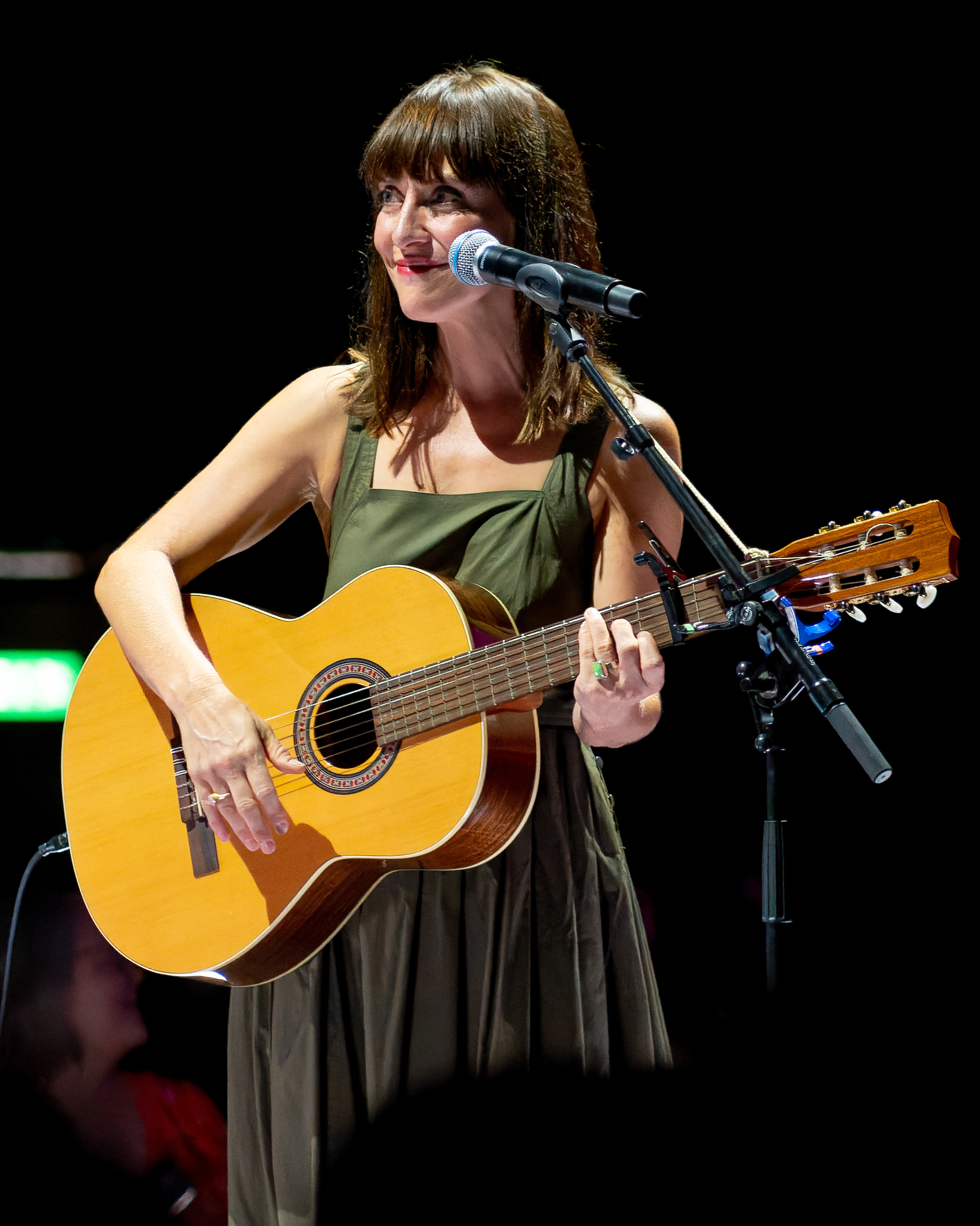
Leslie Feist

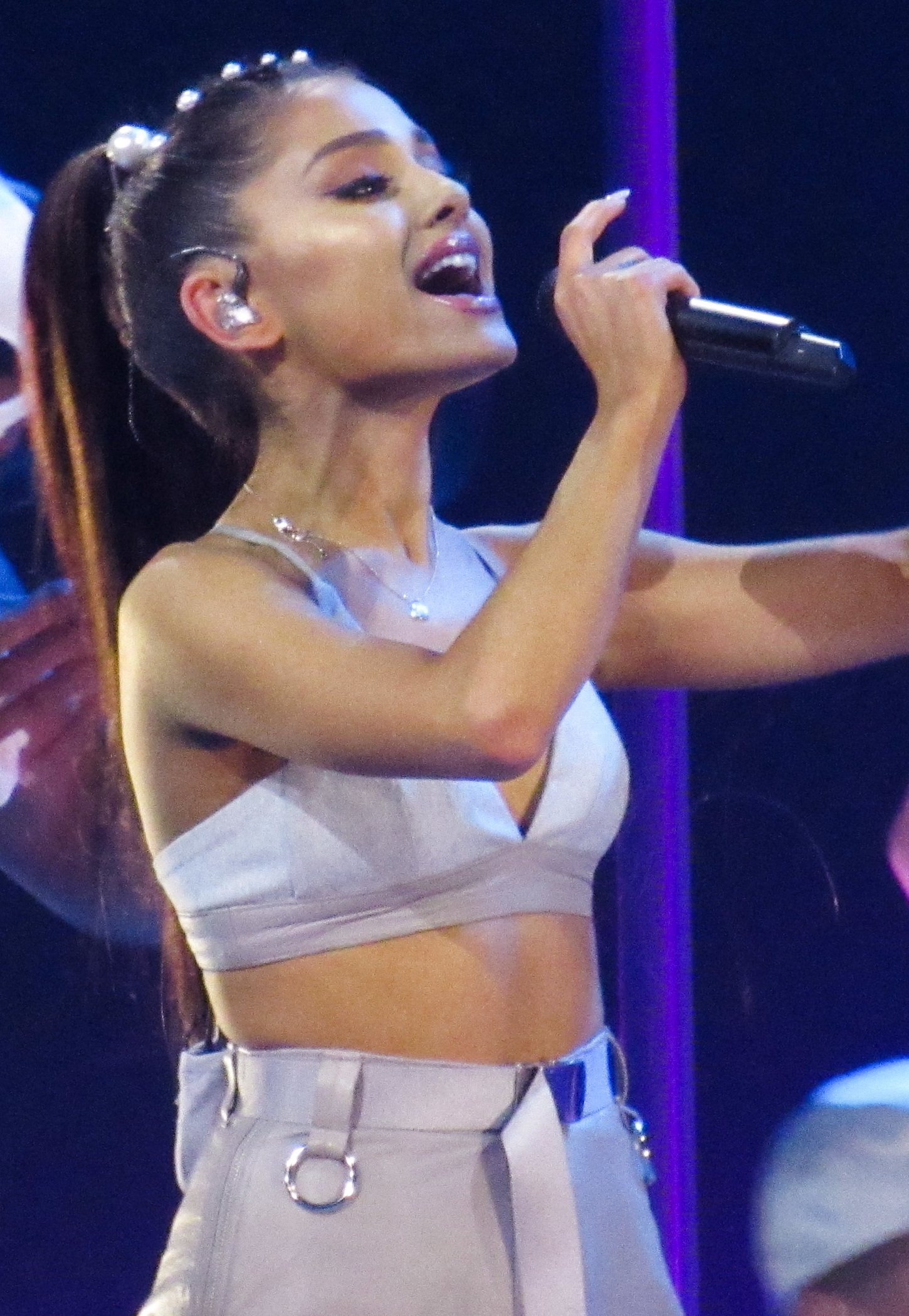
Ariana Grande

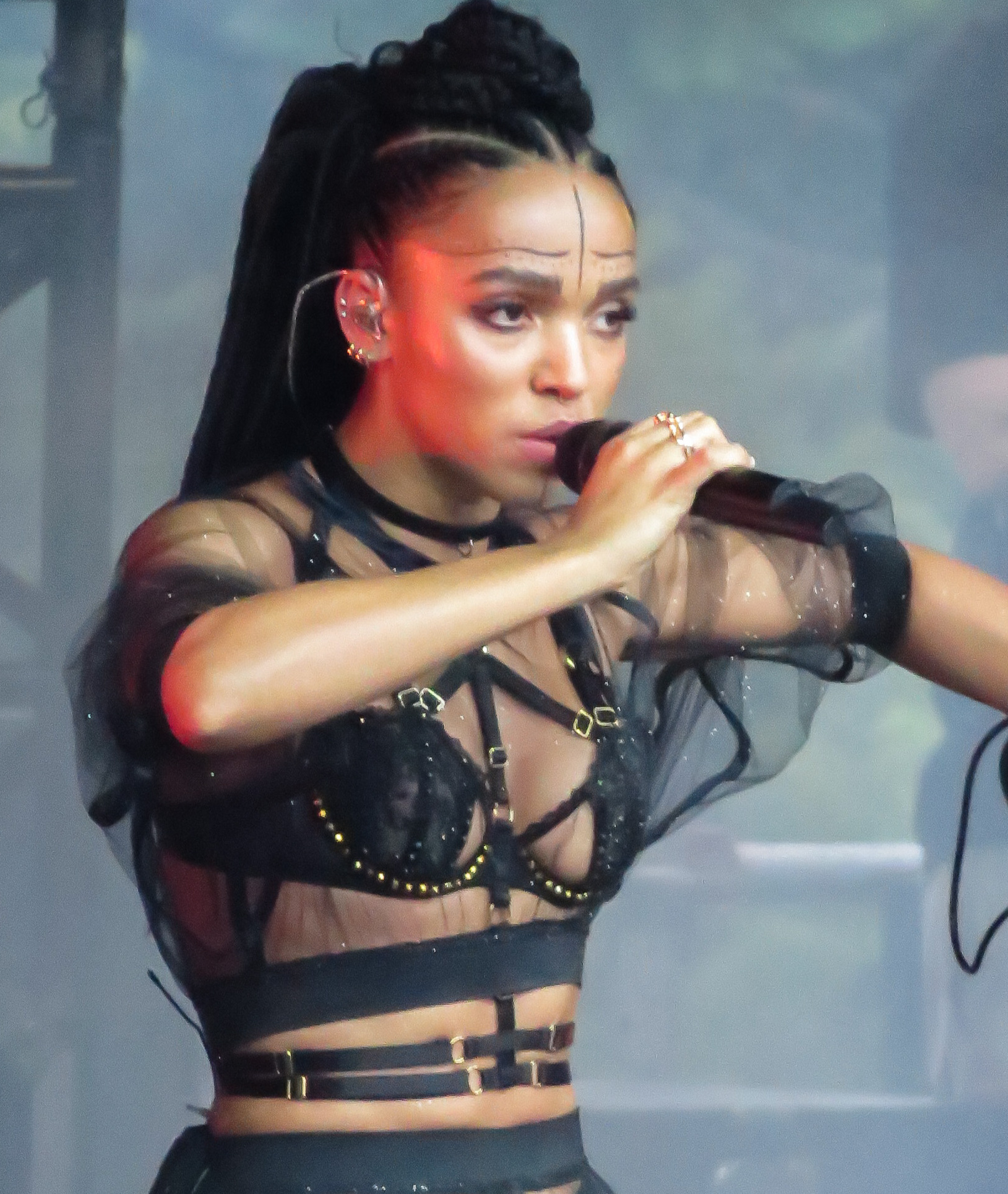
FKA Twigs

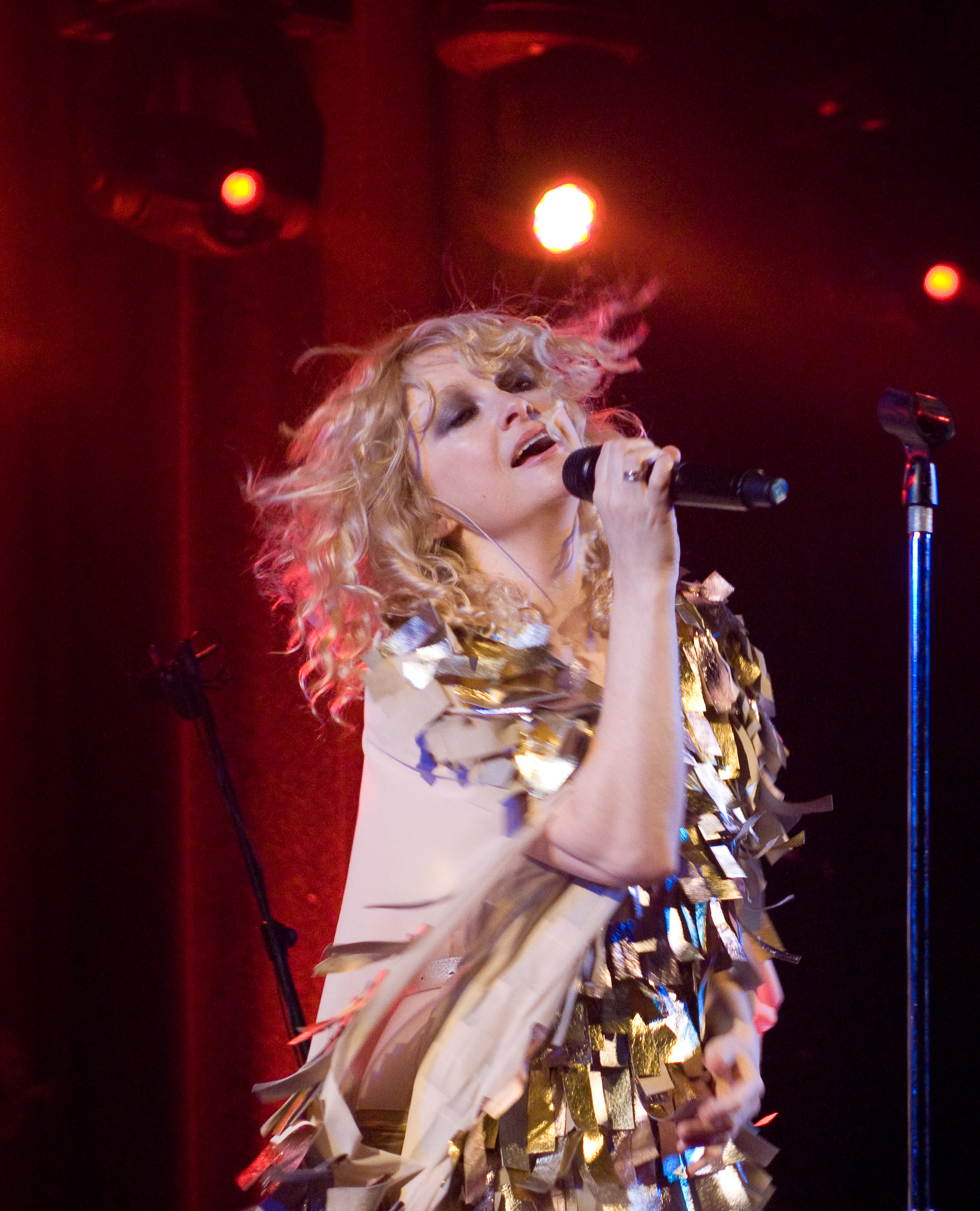
Alison Goldfrapp

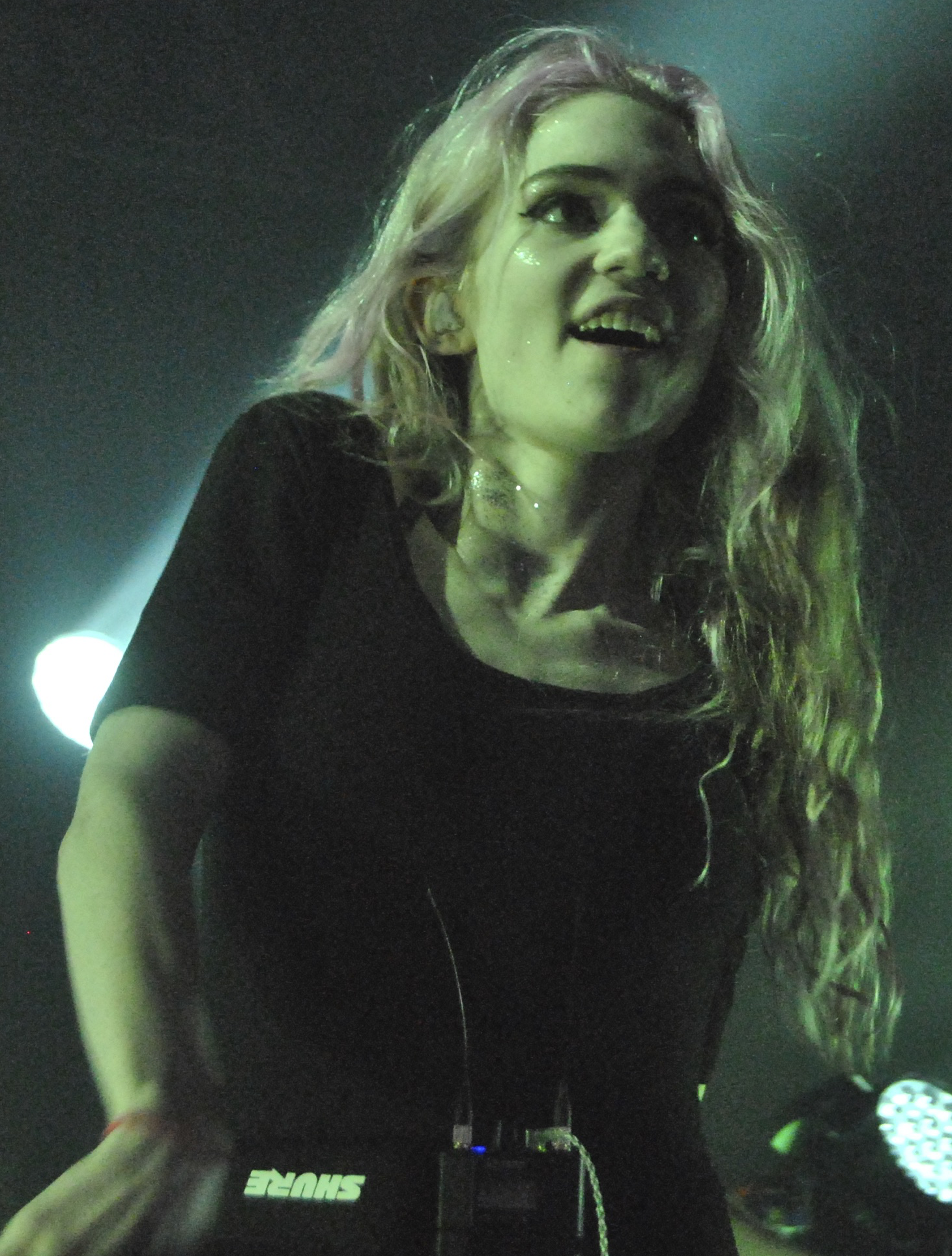
Grimes

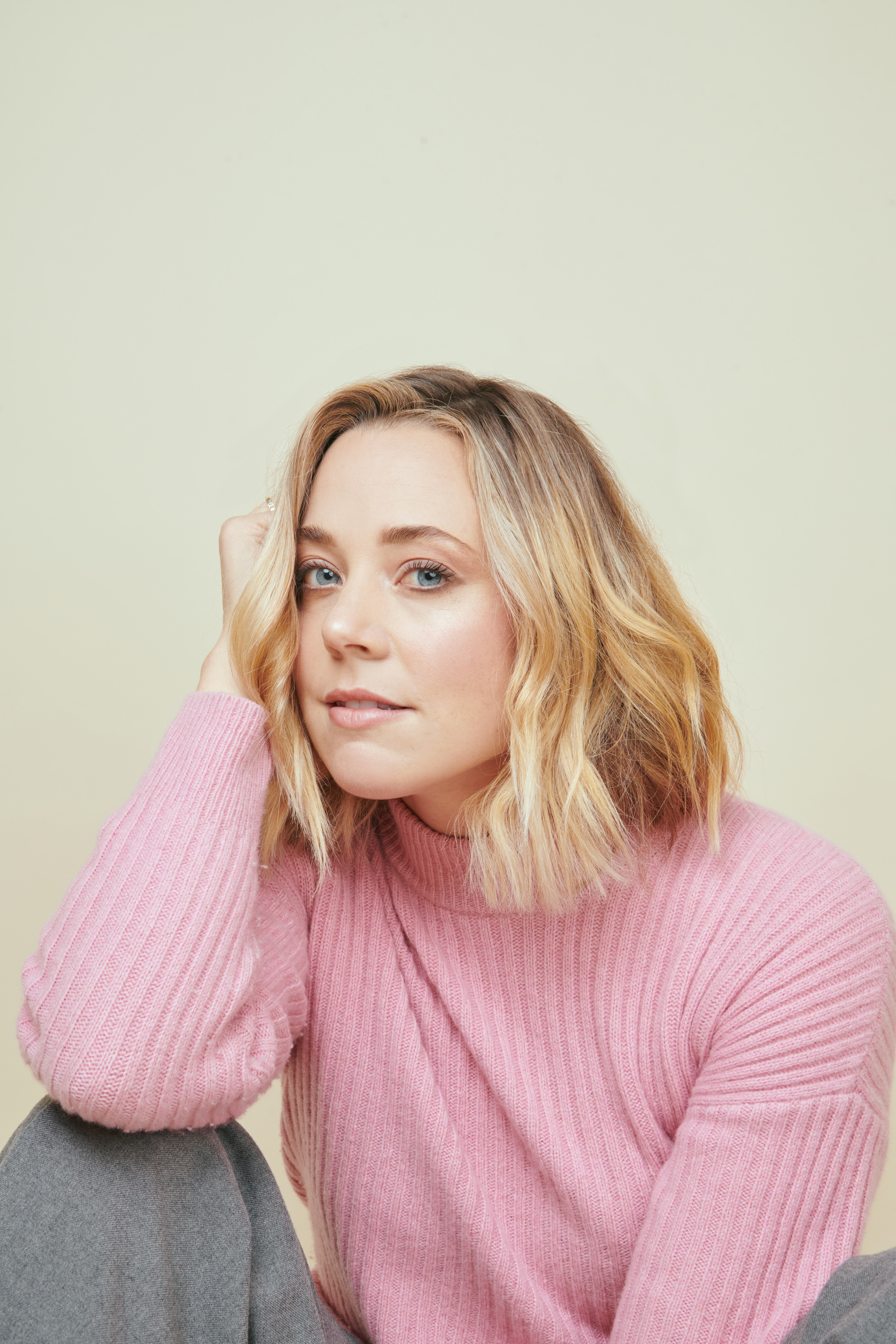
Erika Henningsen

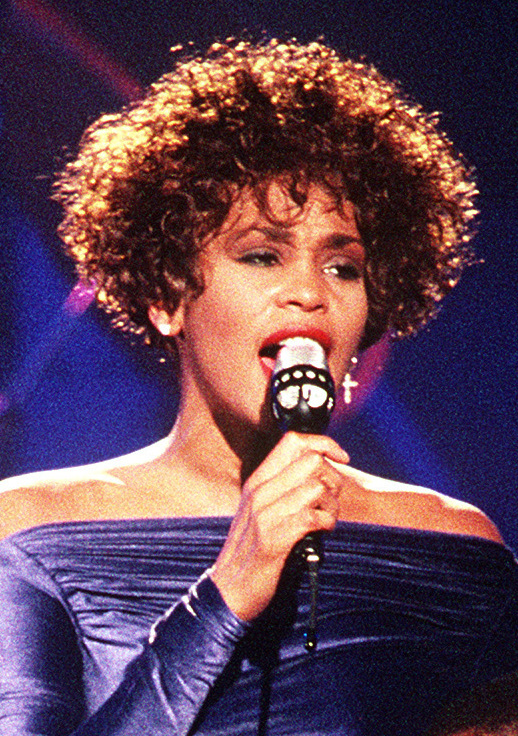
Whitney Houston

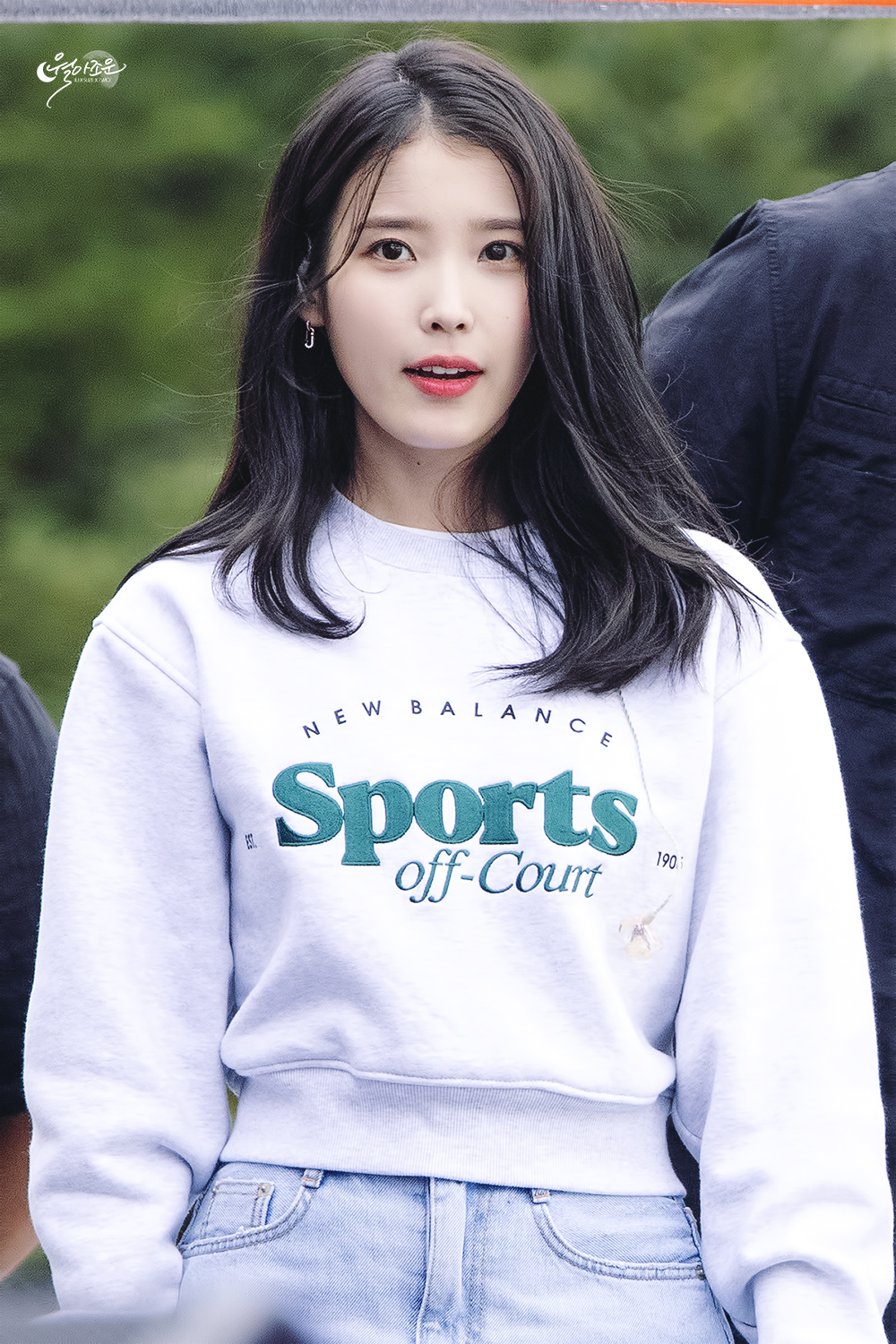
IU

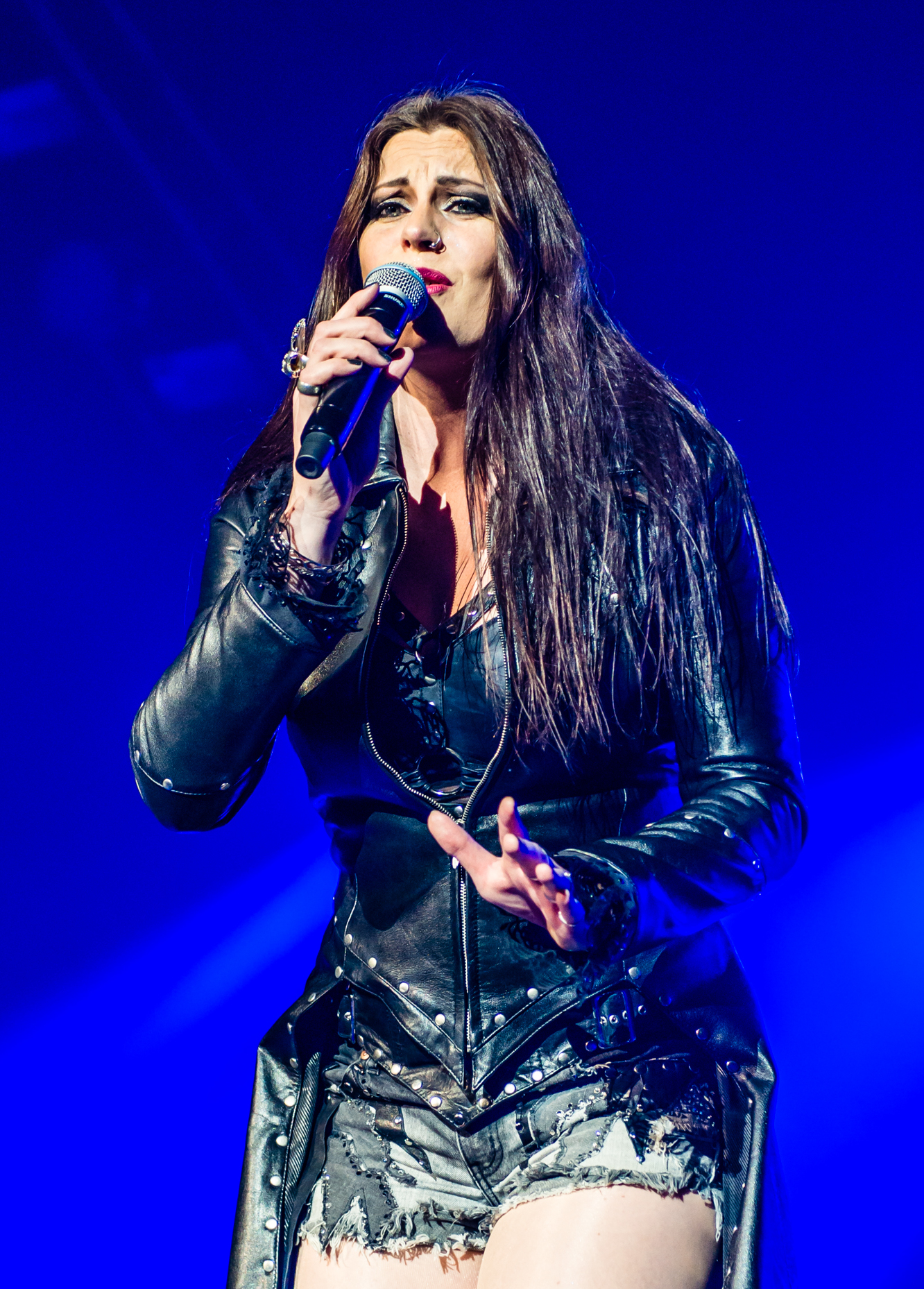
Floor Jansen

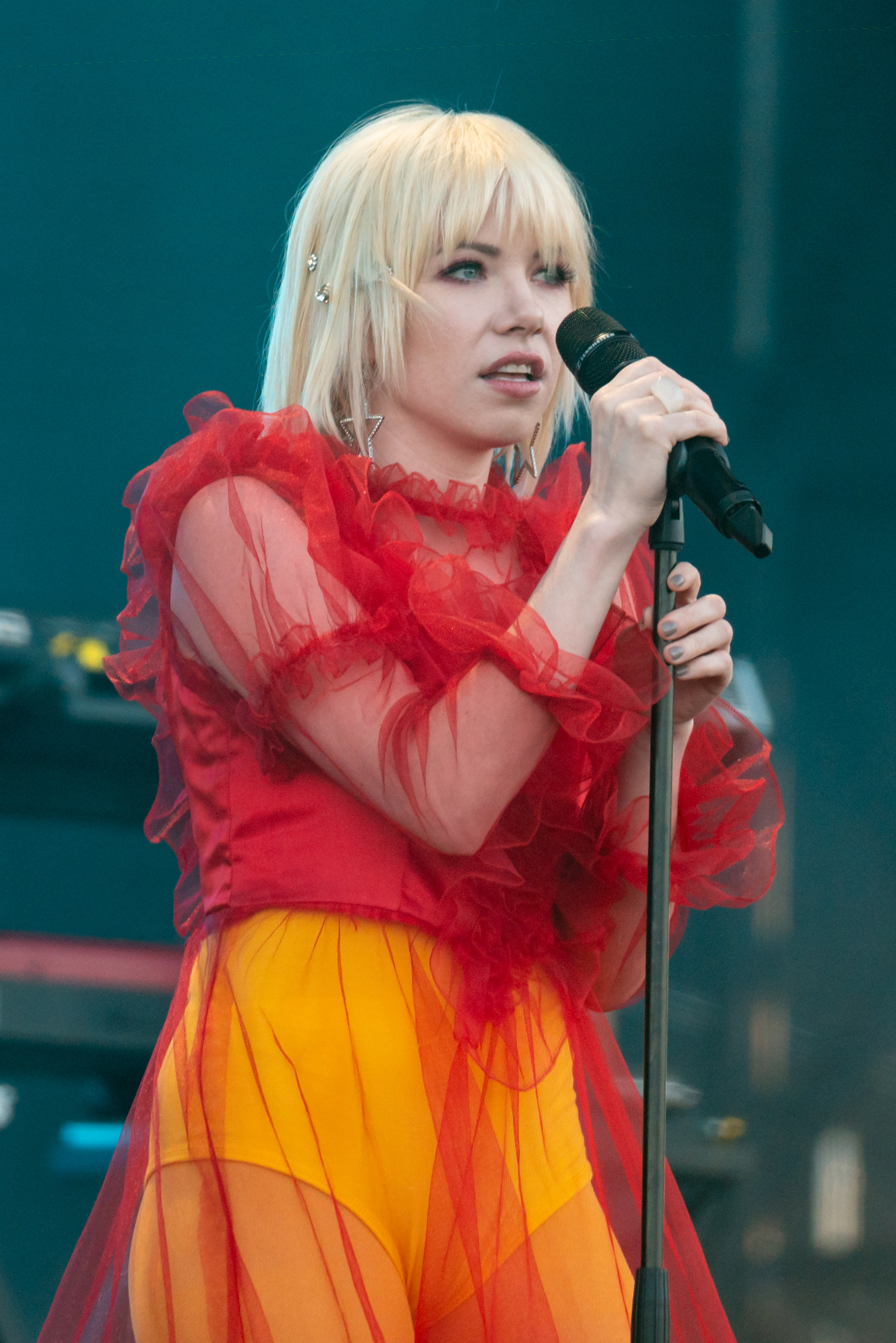
Carly Rae Jepsen

Shirley Jones

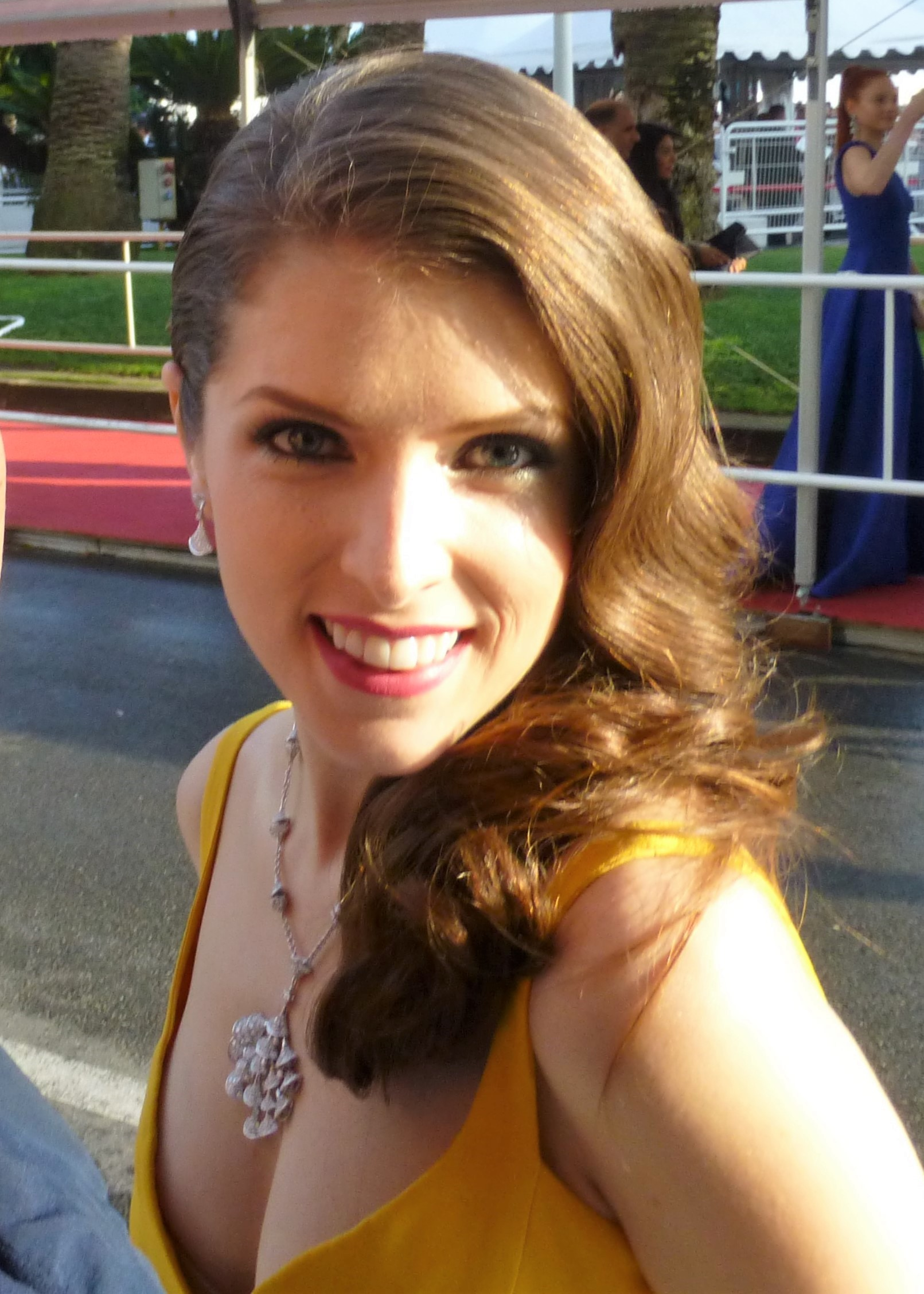
Anna Kendrick

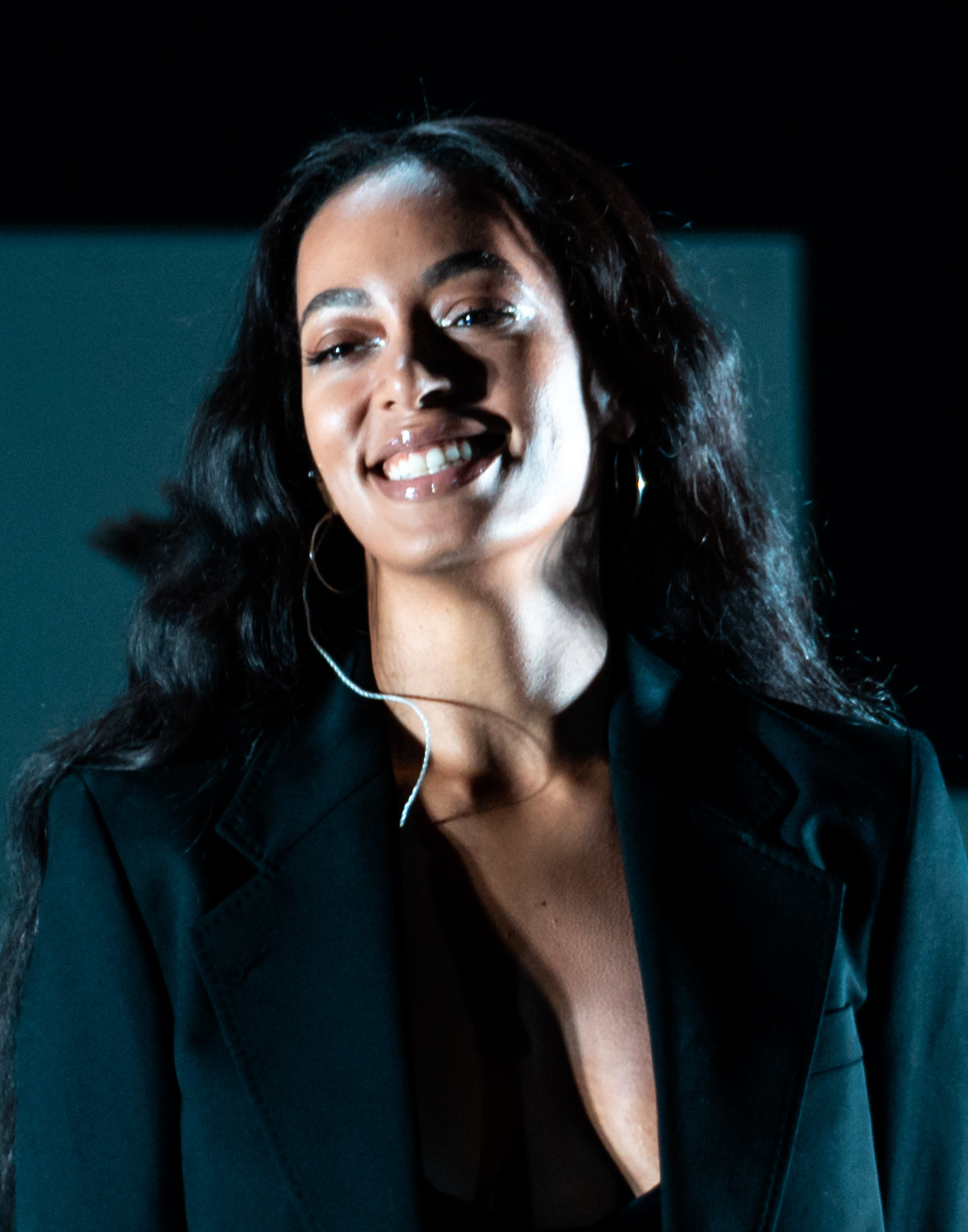
Solange Knowles

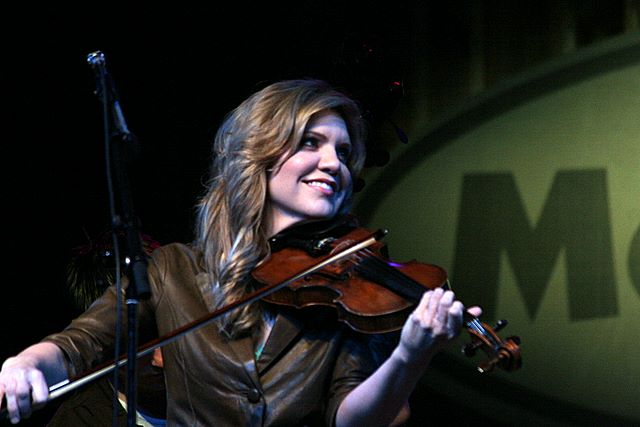
Alison Krauss

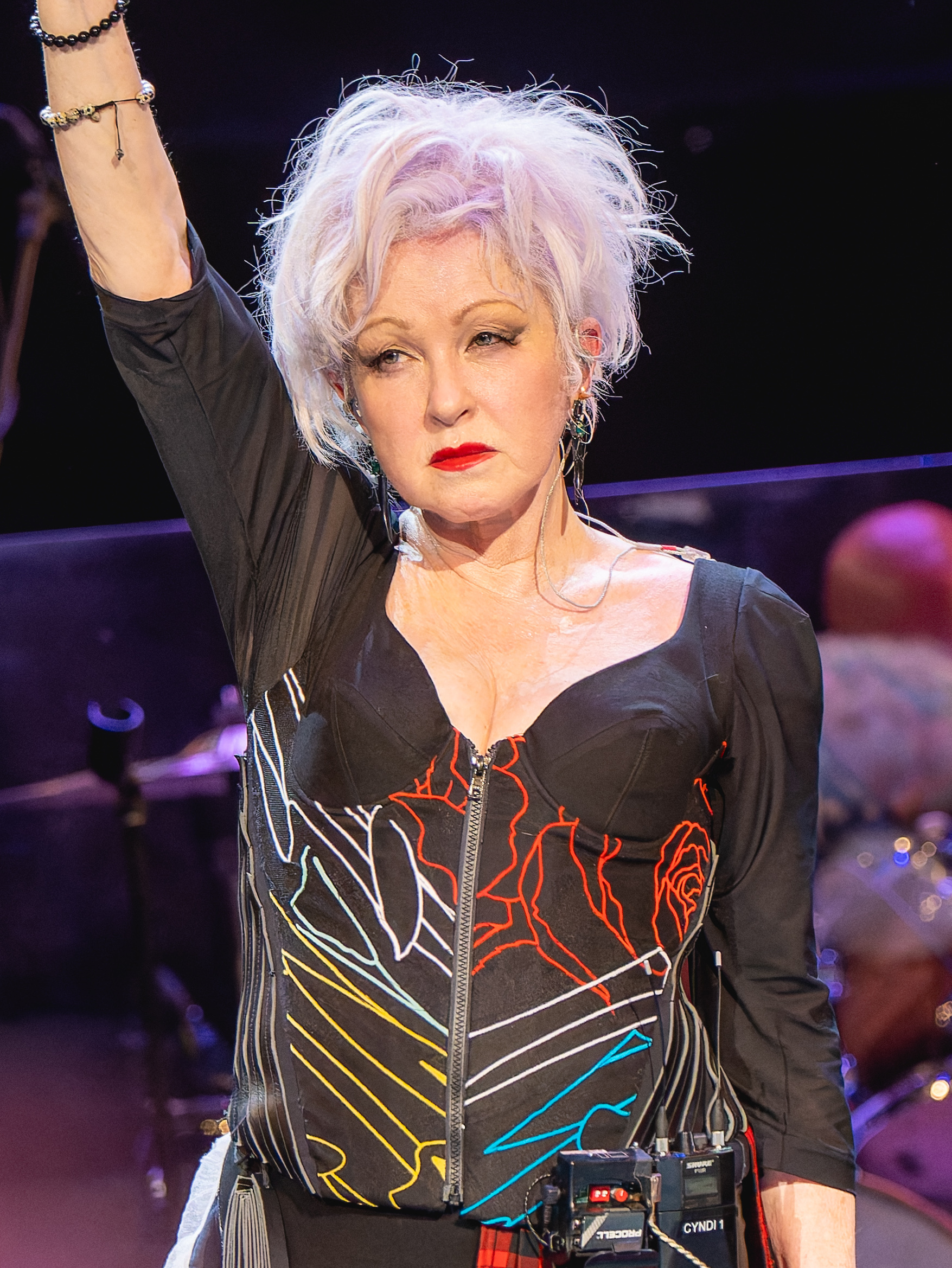
Cyndi Lauper

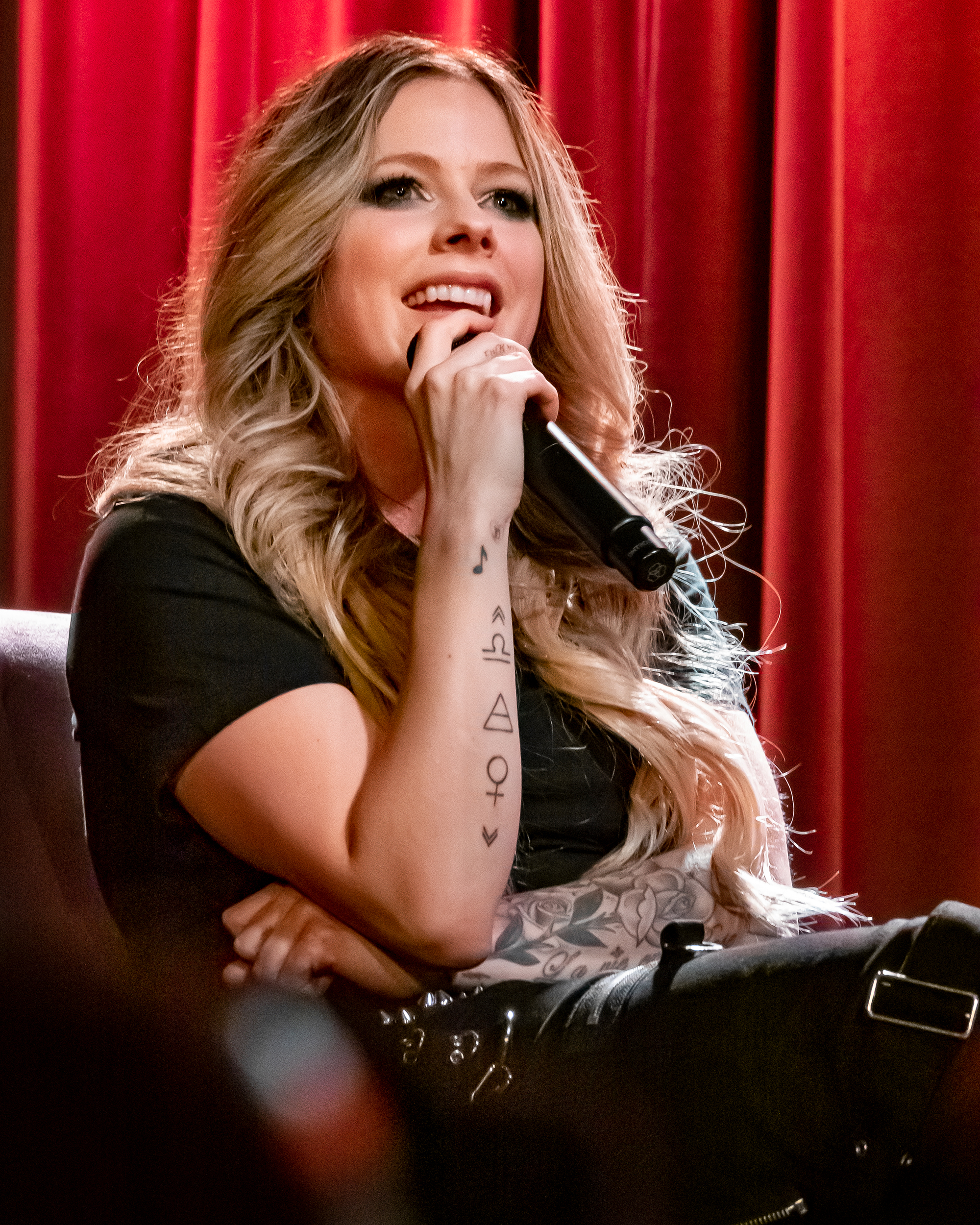
Avril Lavigne

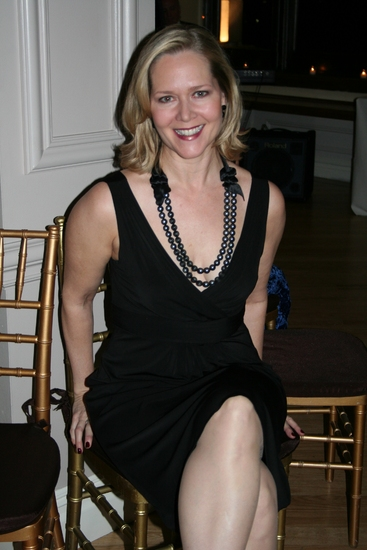
Rebecca Luker

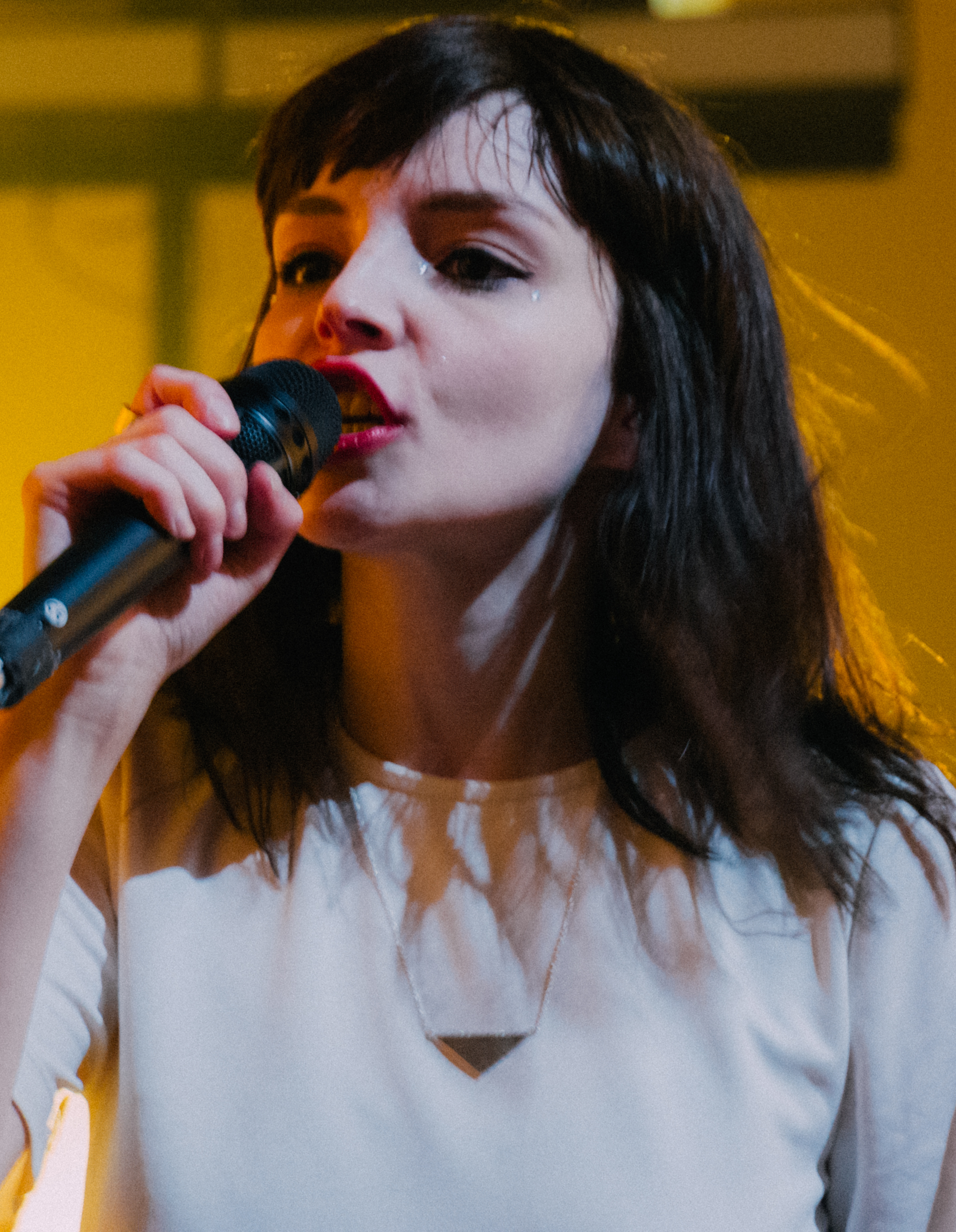
Lauren Mayberry

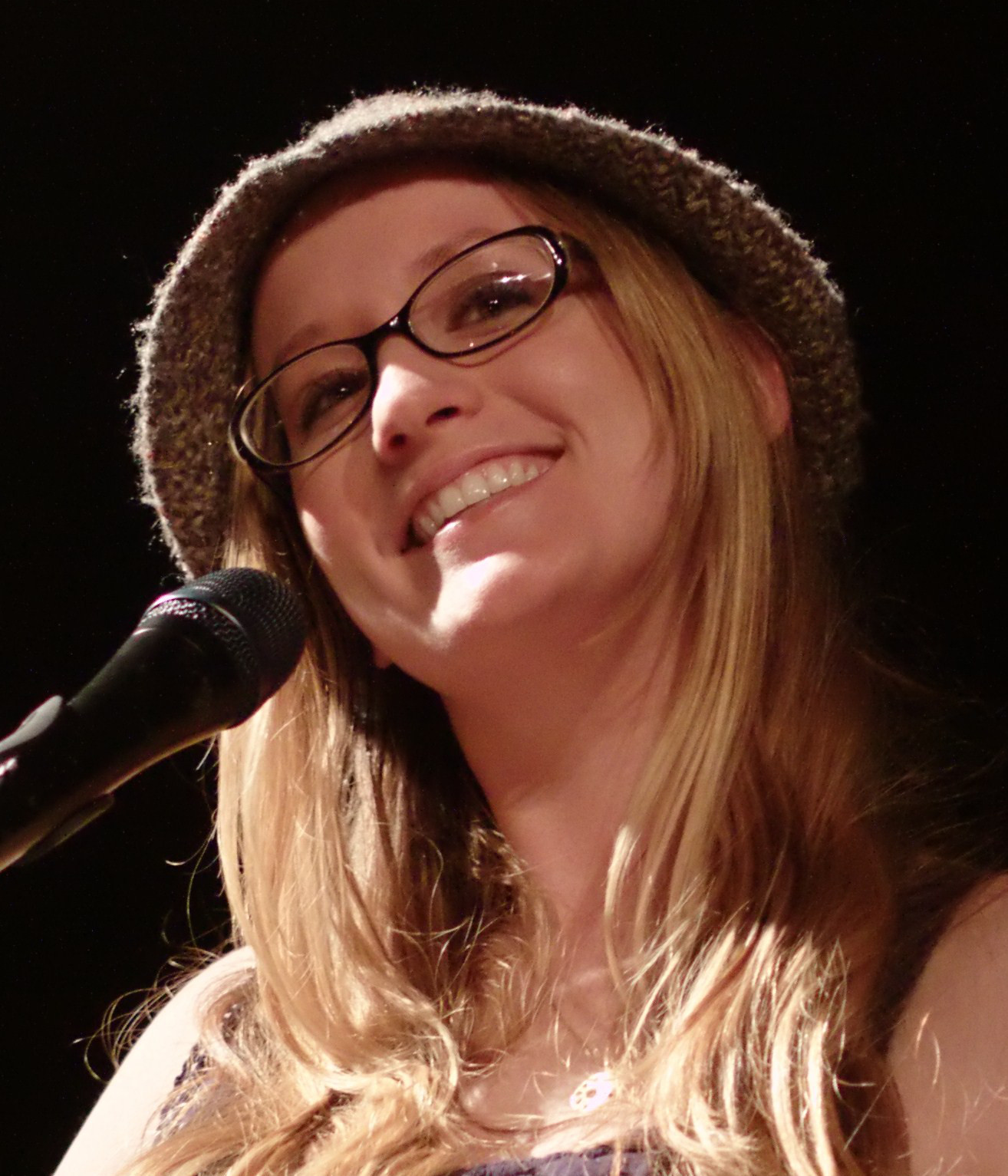
Ingrid Michaelson

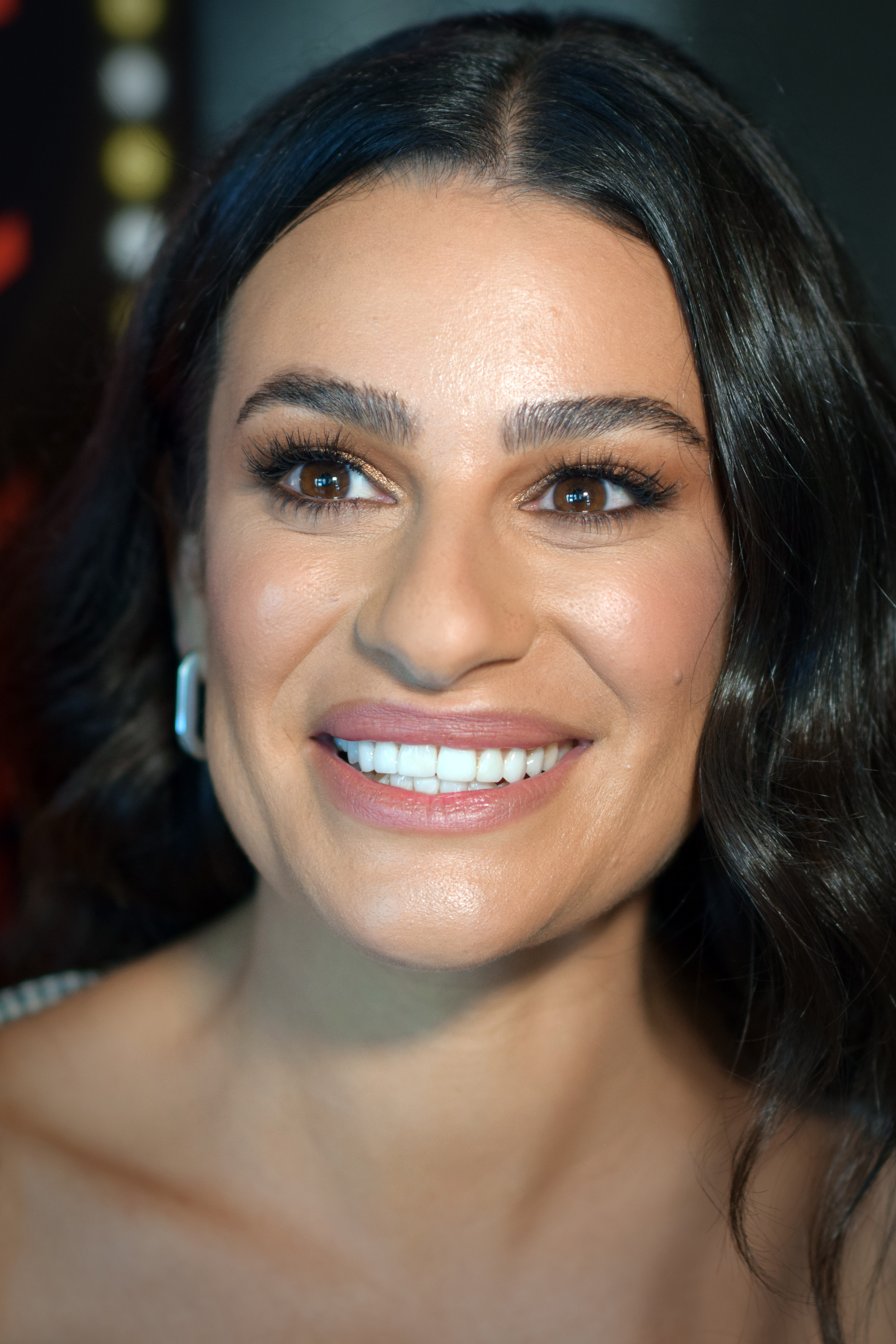
Lea Michele

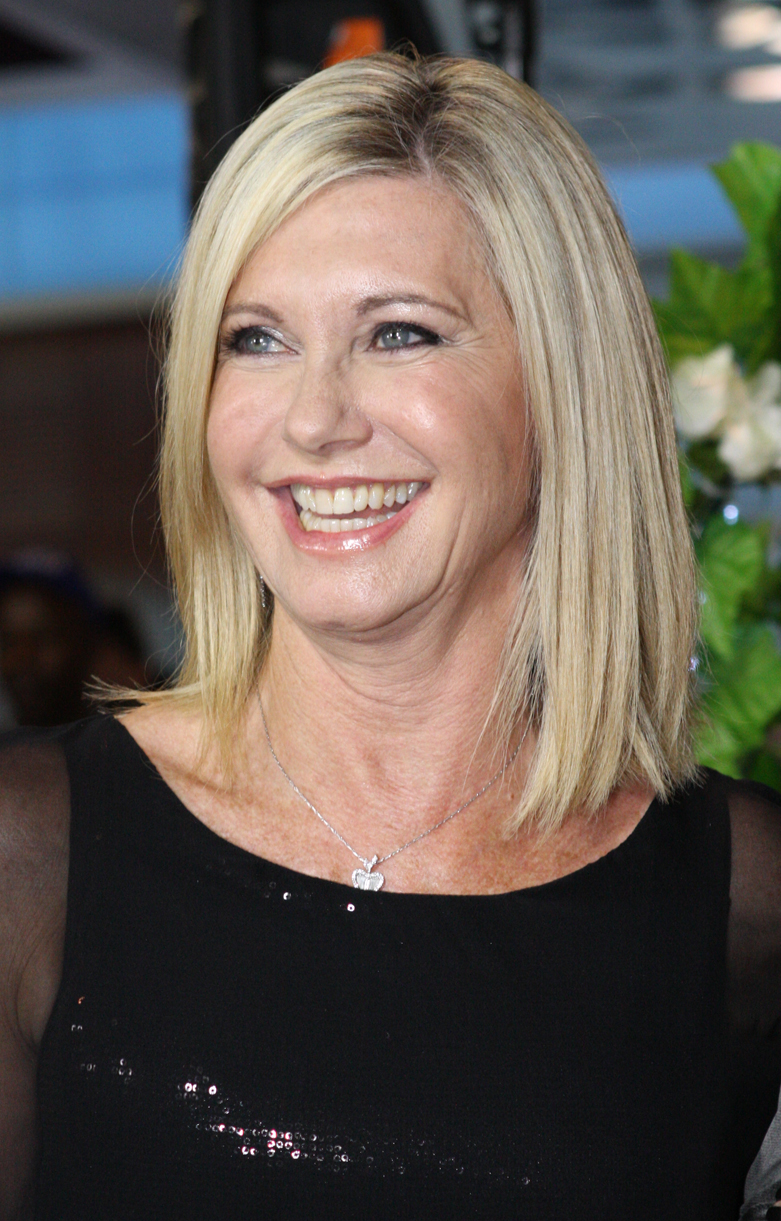
Olivia Newton-John

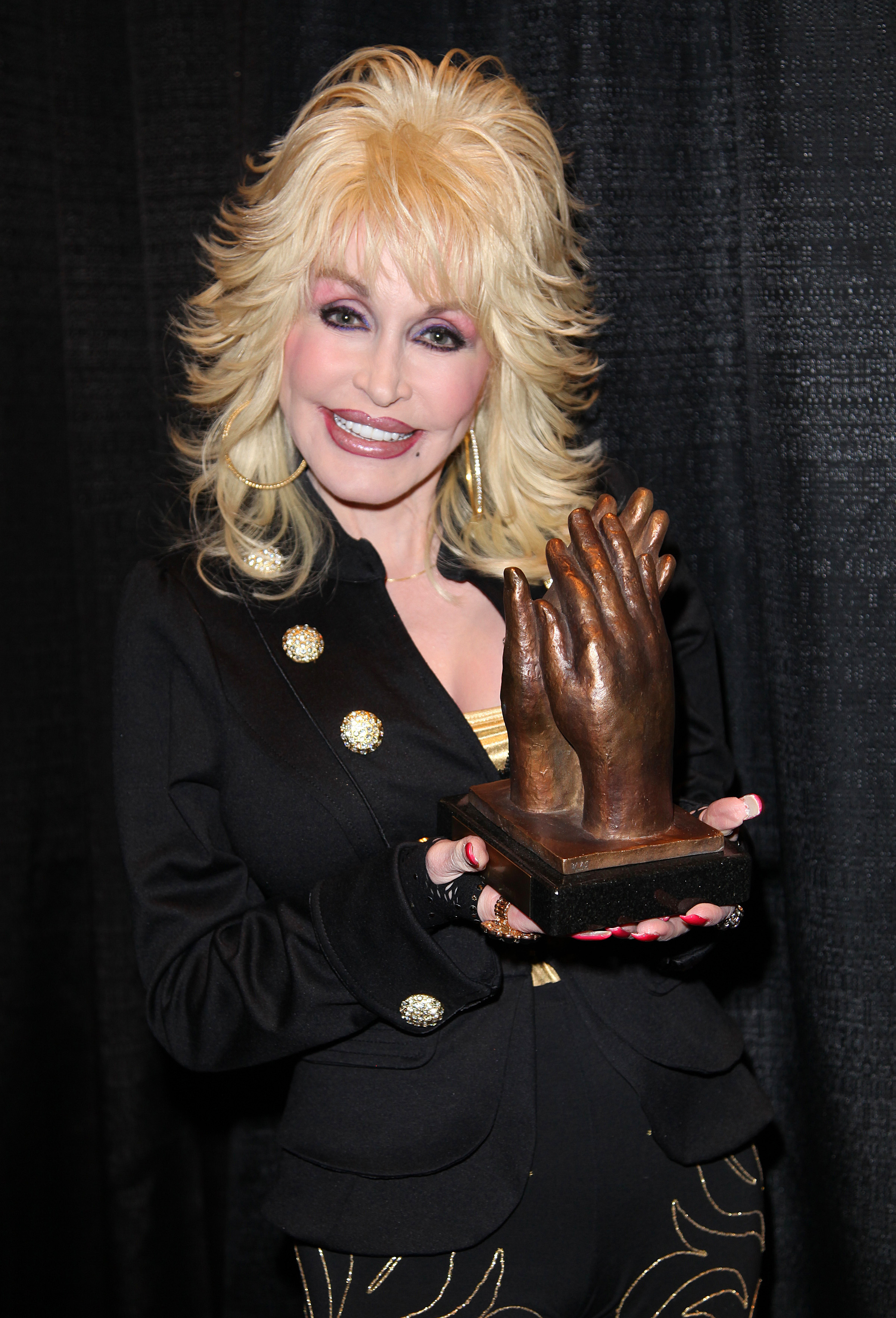
Dolly Parton

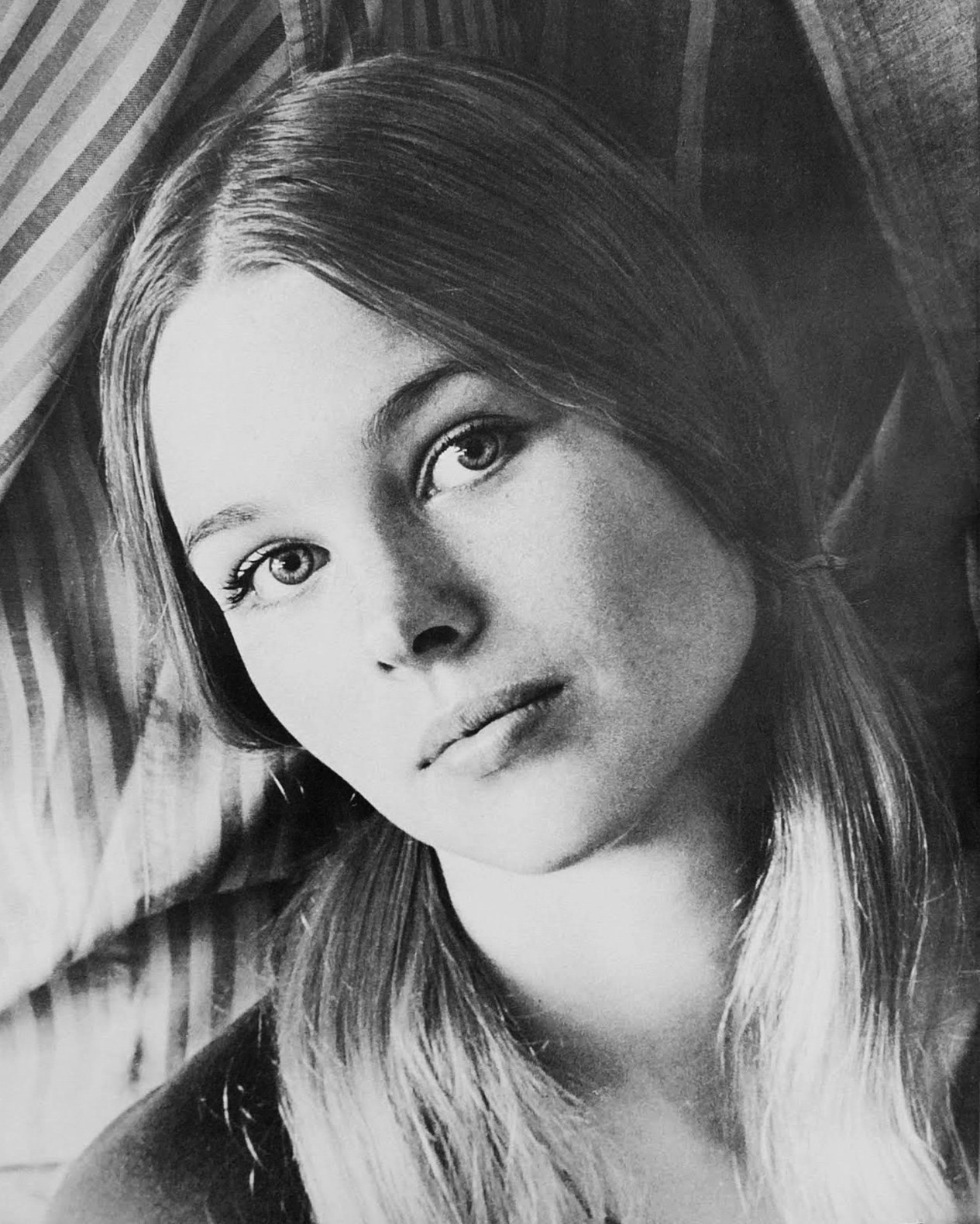
Michelle Phillips

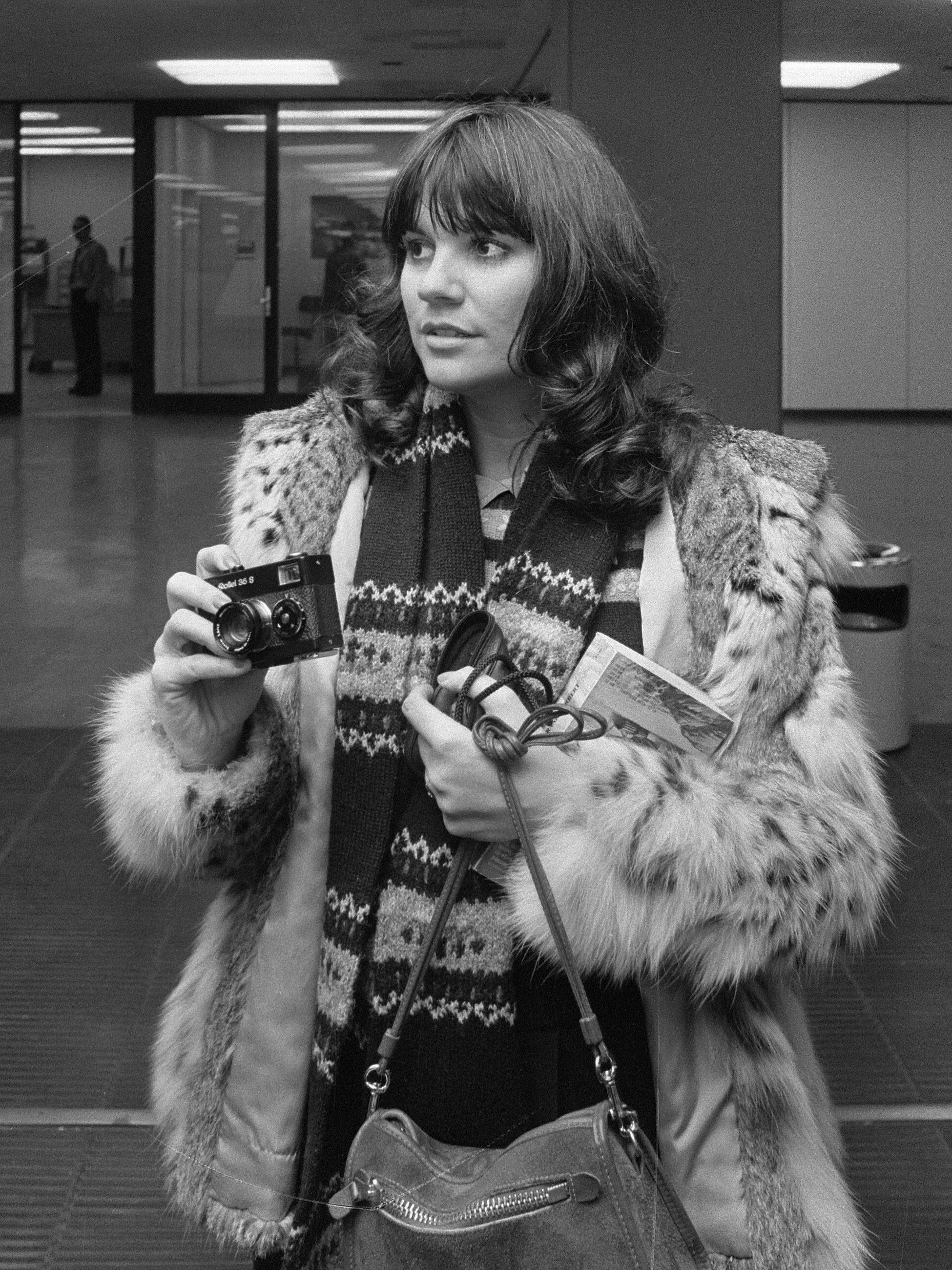
Linda Ronstadt

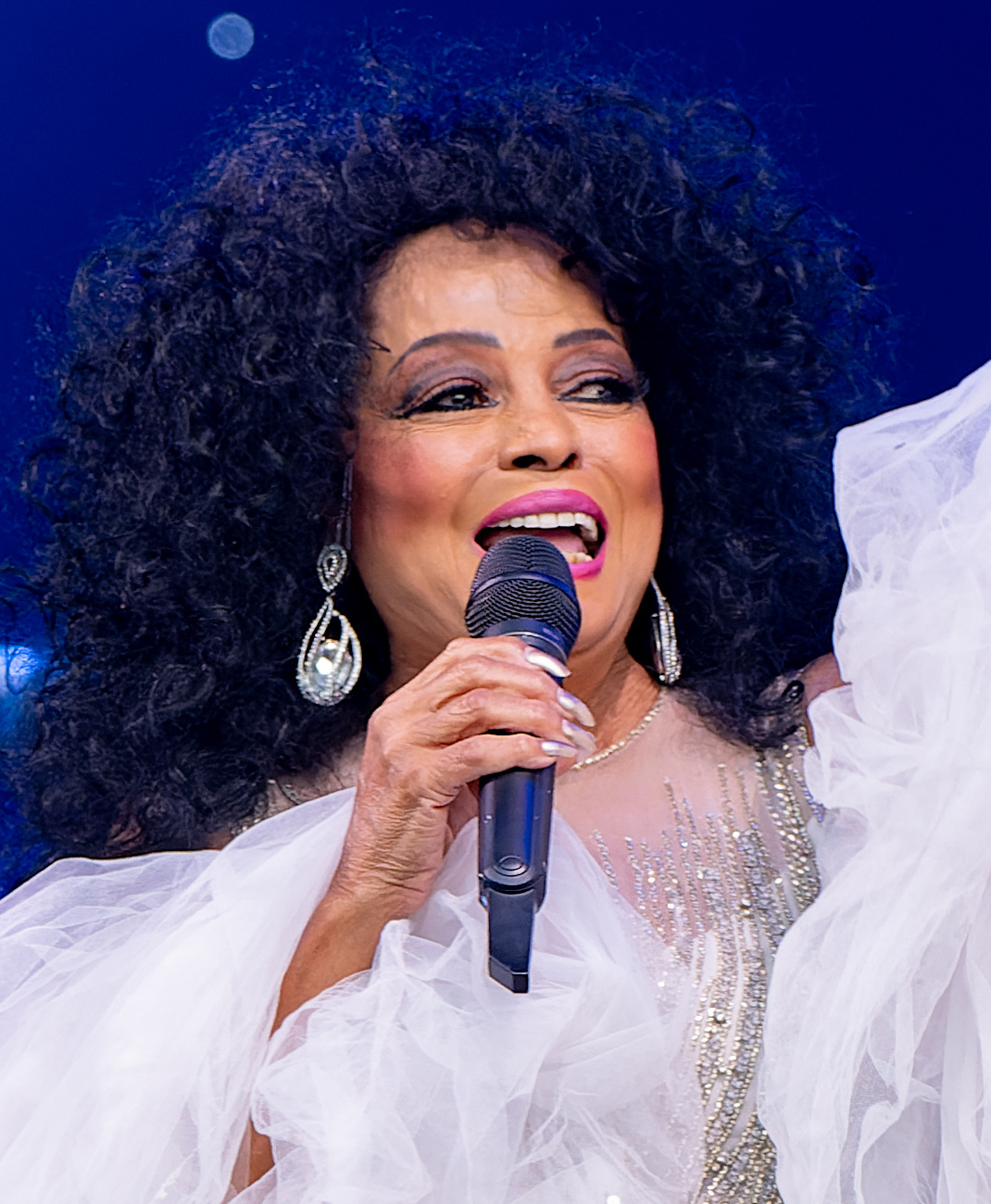
Diana Ross

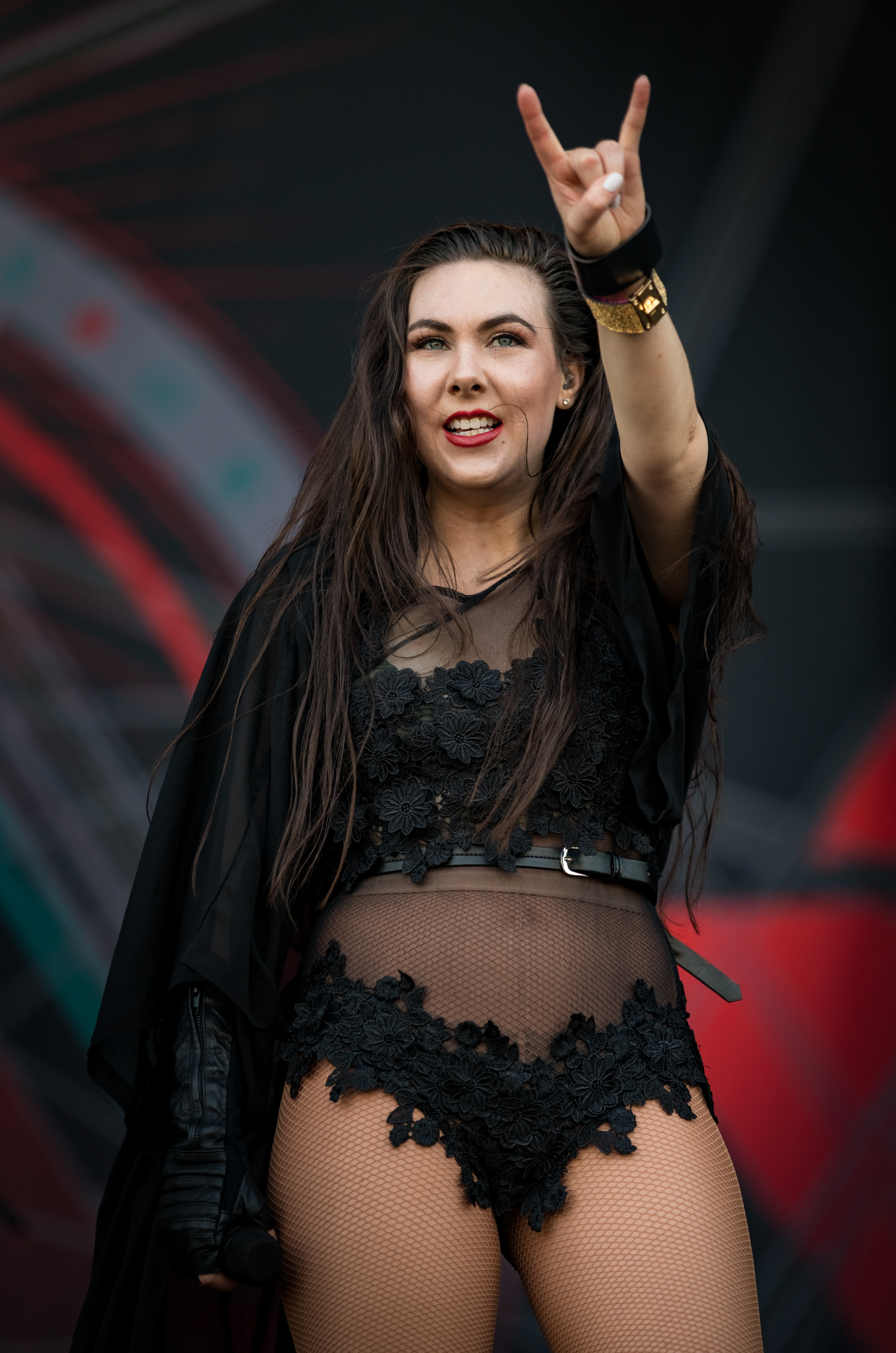
Elize Ryd

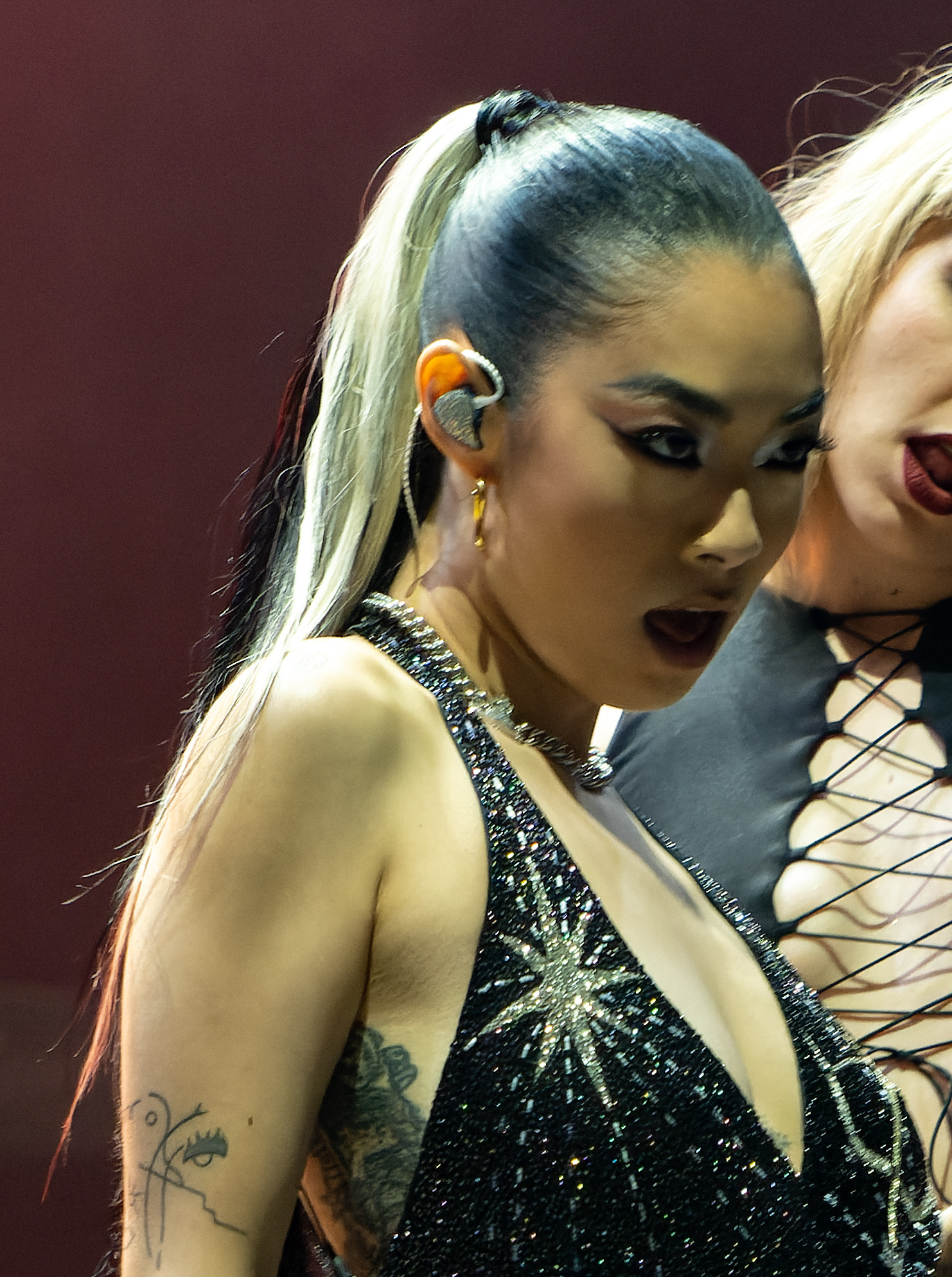
Rina Sawayama

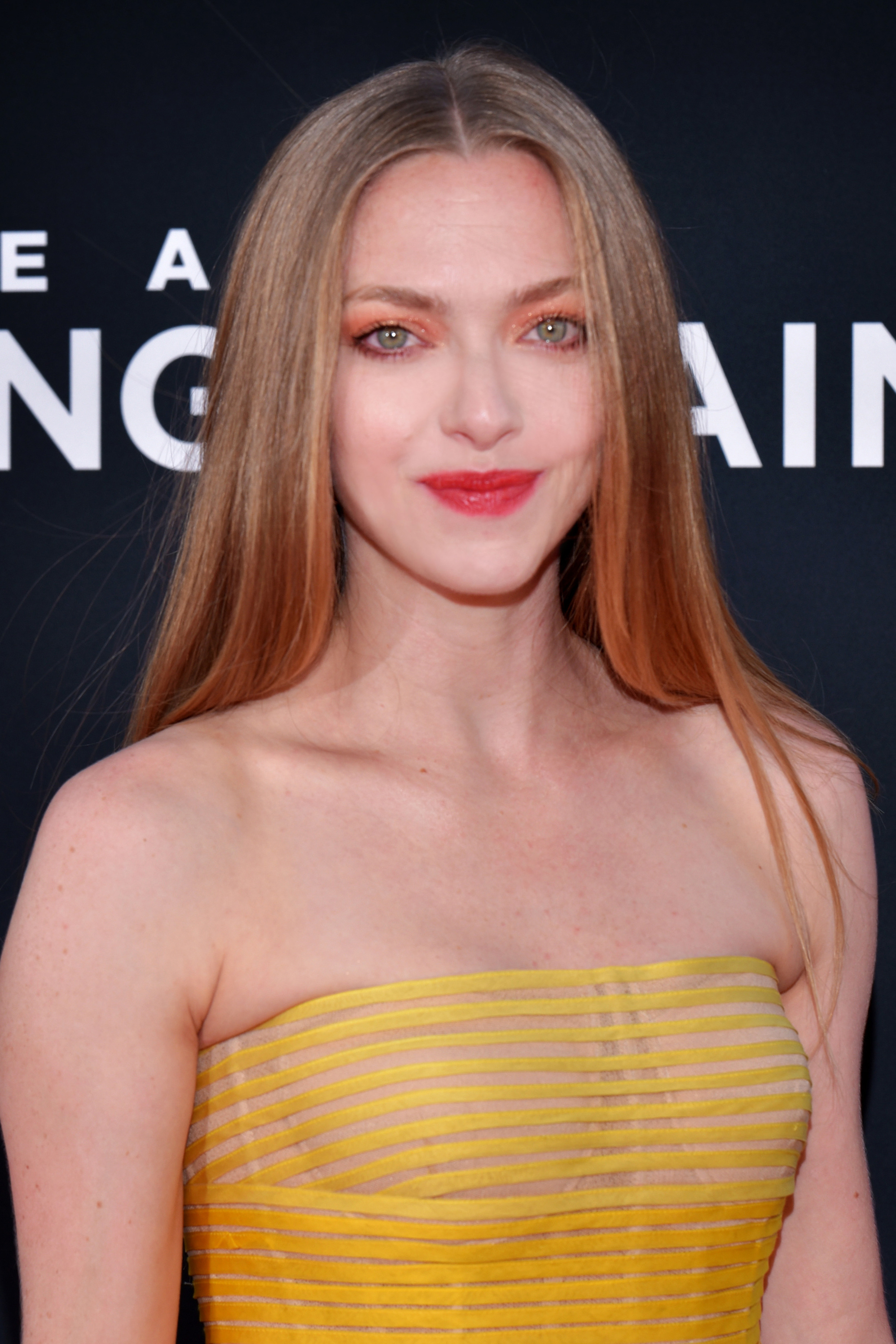
Amanda Seyfried

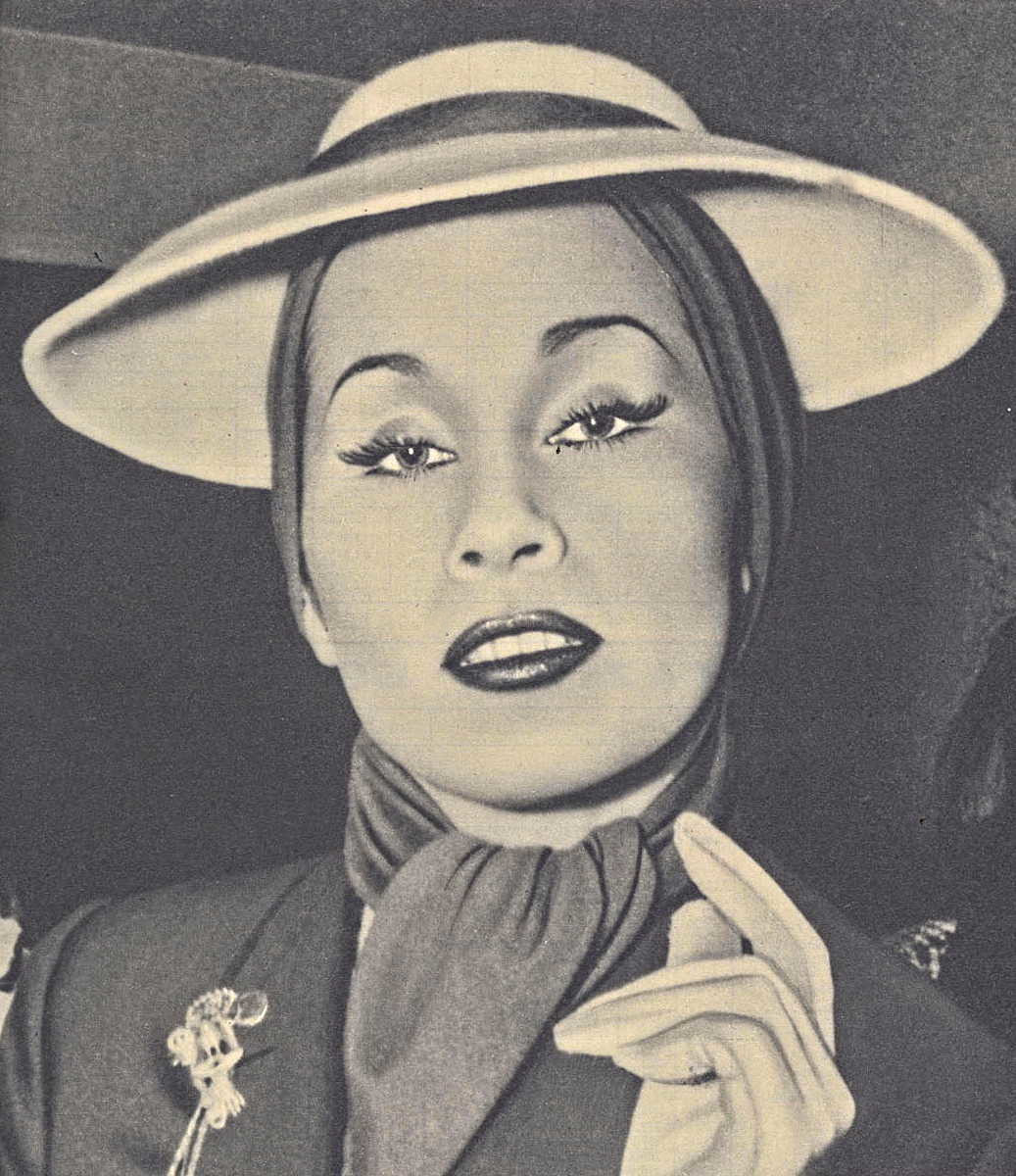
Yma Sumac

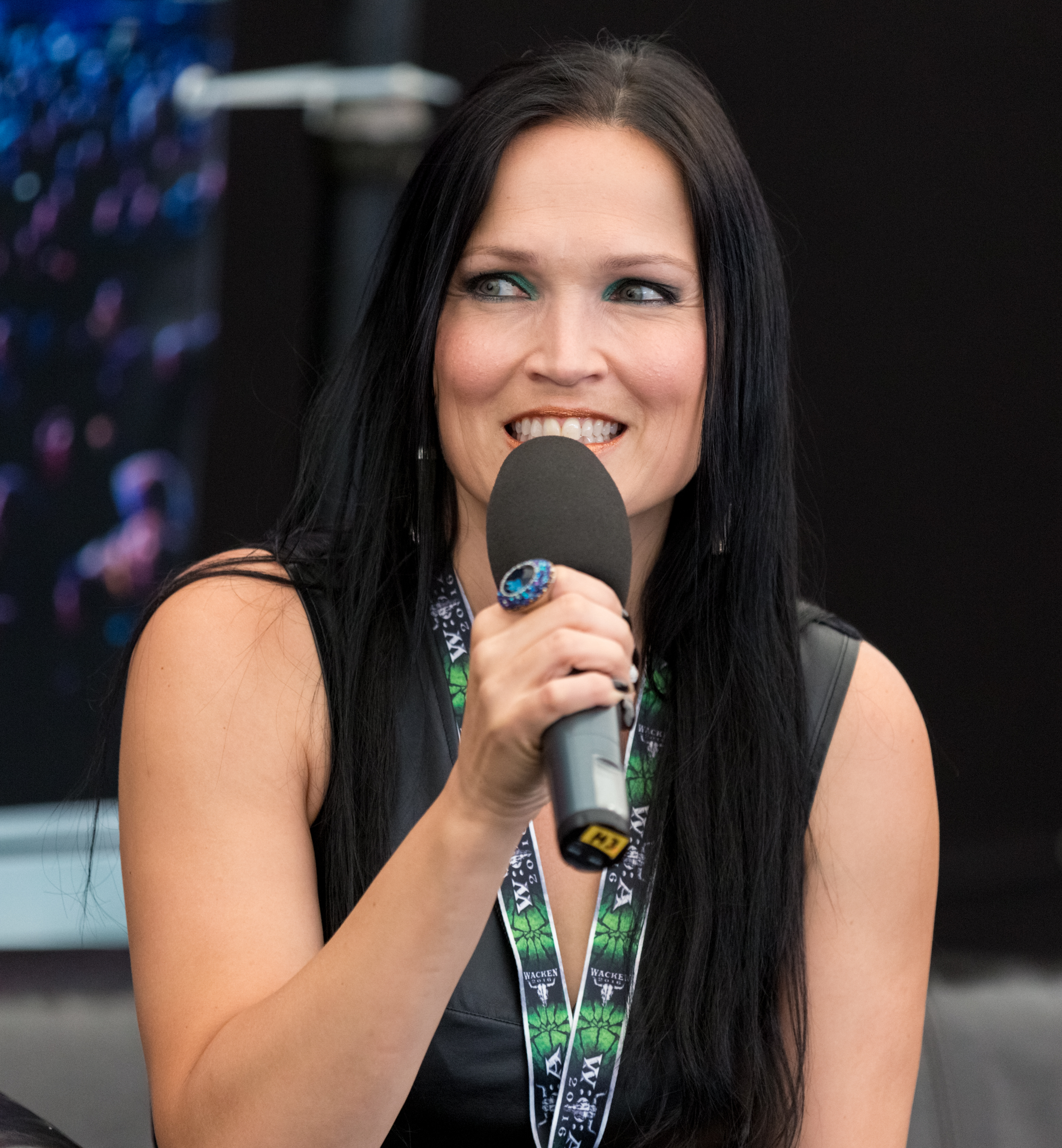
Tarja Turunen

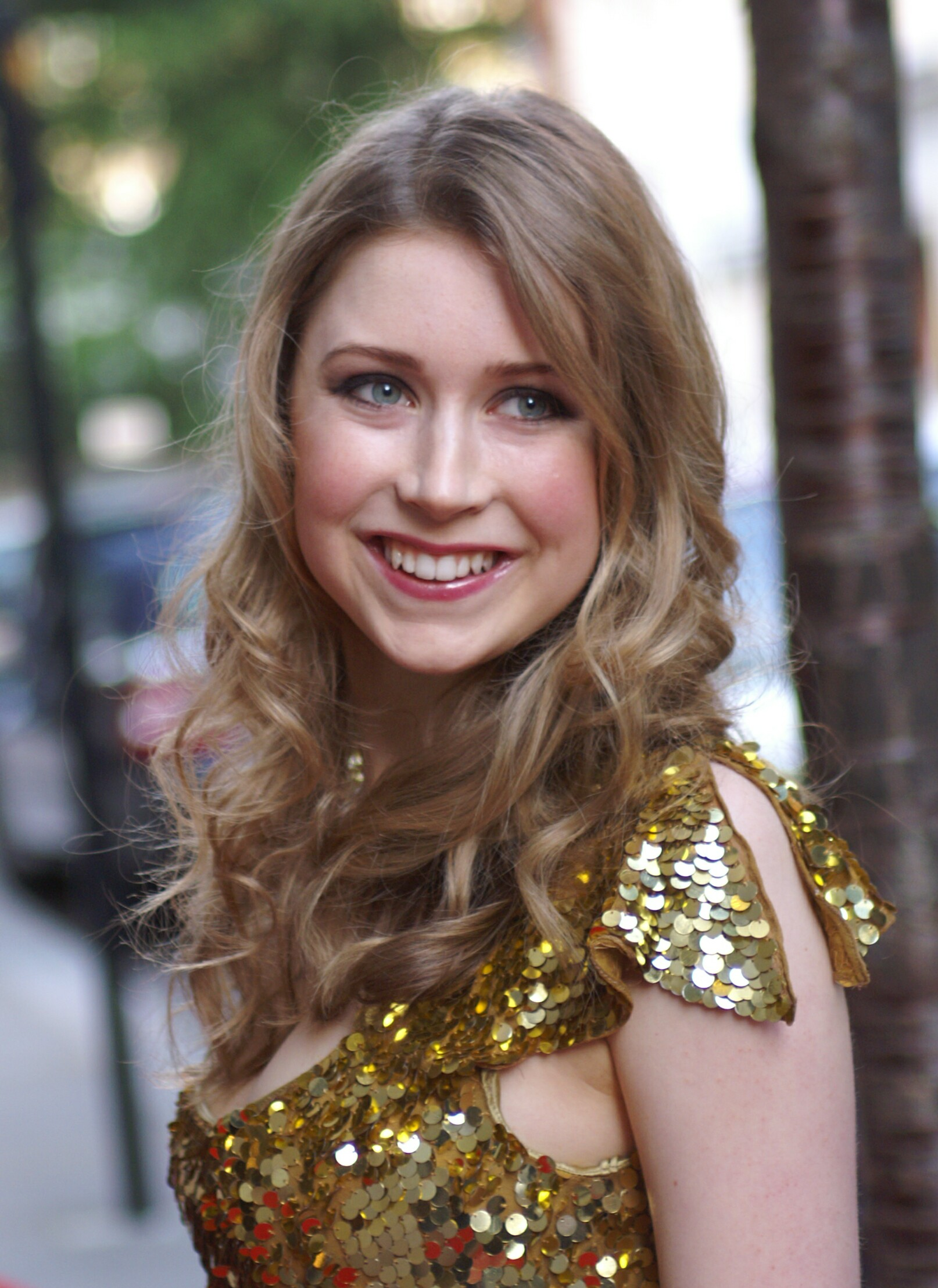
Hayley Westenra

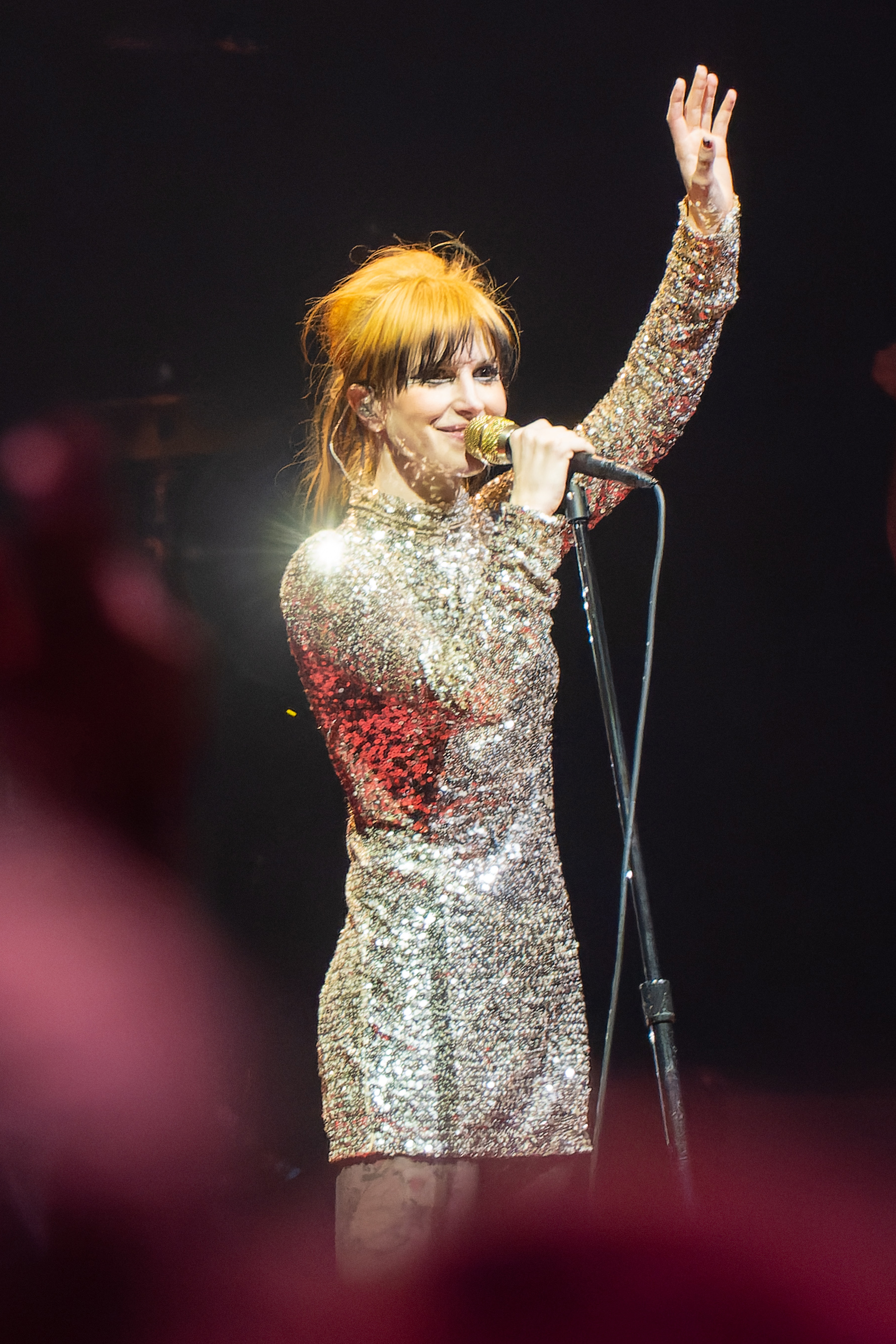
Hayley Williams

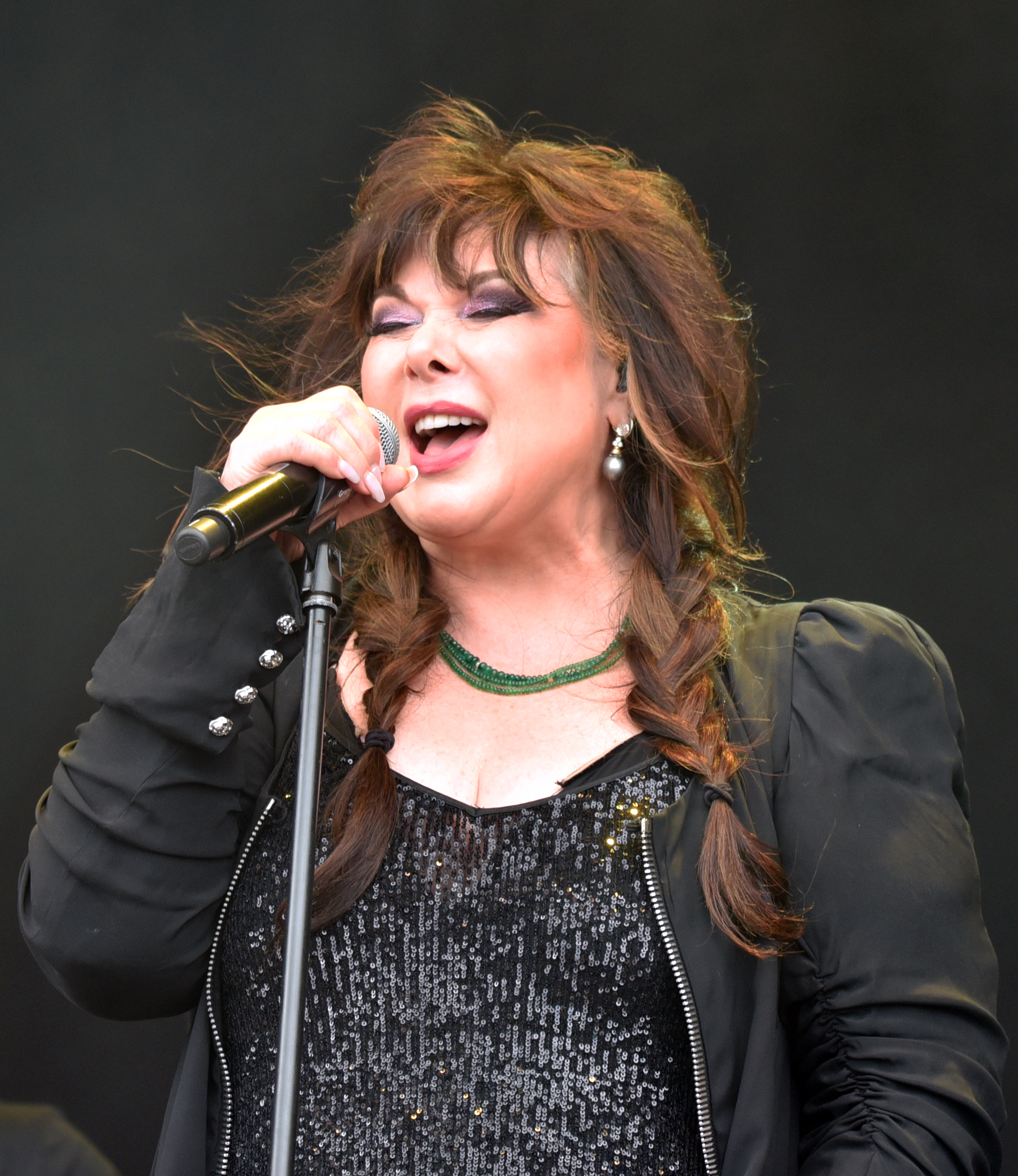
Ann Wilson

Go to: A • B • C • D • E • F • G • H • I • J • K • L • M • N • O • P • Q • R • S • T • U • V • W • X • Y • Z

Name	Lifespan	Nationality	Associated act(s)	Refs.
Aaliyah	1979–2001	American		
Gracie Abrams (Note: Abrams is also referred to as a mezzo-soprano)	1999–	American		
Adéla	2003–	Slovak		
Amy Adams	1974–	American		
Tawatha Agee	1954–	American	Mtume	
Chloë Agnew	1989–	Irish	Celtic Woman	
Christina Aguilera (Note: Some sources also refer to Aguilera as a mezzo-soprano)	1980–	American		
Priscilla Ahn	1984–	American		
Jhené Aiko (Note: Aiko is also referred to as a mezzo-soprano)	1988–	American	Cocaine 80s; Twenty88	
Christine Allado	1995–	Filipino-British		
Lily Allen	1985–	English		
Sophie Allison	1997–	American	Soccer Mommy	
Christy Altomare	1986–	American		
Marsha Ambrosius	1977–	English	Floetry	
Amerie	1980–	American		
Morissette Amon	1996–	Filipino		
Kerstin Anderson	1994–	American		
Courtney Marie Andrews	1990–	American		
Julie Andrews	1935–	English		
Maxene Andrews	1916–1995	American	The Andrews Sisters	
Lam Anh	1987–	Vietnamese		
Tina Arena	1967–	Italian-Australian		
Vanessa Bell Armstrong	1953–	American		
Ashanti	1980–	American		
Annaleigh Ashford	1985–	American		
Rosalind Ashford	1943–2026	American	Martha and the Vandellas	
Natacha Atlas	1964–	Egyptian-Belgian		
Daniela Avanzini	2004–	American	Katseye	
Aurora	1996–	Norwegian		
Katy B	1989–	English		
Joan Baez	1941–	American		
Bali Baby	1997–	American		
Halle Bailey	2000–	American	Chloe x Halle	
Julien Baker	1995–	American	Boygenius; Julien Baker & Torres	
Florence Ballard	1943–1976	American	The Supremes	
Colleen Ballinger	1986–	American		
Alina Baraz	1993–	American		
Ali Barter	1986–	Australian		
Julianna Barwick	1979– or 1980–	American	Ombré	
Annie Mottram Craig Batten	1883-1964	Canadian		
Beabadoobee	2000-	British		
Kat Bean		American	Amanda X	
Shoshana Bean	1977-	American		
Kristen Bell	1980–	American		
Rita Bell	1893–1992	American		
Laura Benanti	1979–	American		
Jodi Benson	1961– or 1962–	American		
Cheryl Bentyne	1954–	American	The Manhattan Transfer	
Asha Bhosle	1933–2026	Indian		
Christina Bianco	1982–	American		
Cindy Birdsong	1939–	American	Patti LaBelle & the Bluebelles; The Supremes	
Birdy	1996–	English		
Björk	1965–	Icelandic	The Sugarcubes	
Pauline Black	1953–	English	The Selecter	
Sierra Boggess	1982–	American		
Suzy Bogguss	1956–	American		
Bom	1984–	South Korean	2NE1	
Bomi	1993–	South Korean	Apink	
Kadhja Bonet	1987 or 1988–	American		
Michelle Branch	1983–	American	The Wreckers	
Tamar Braxton	1977–	American	The Braxtons	
Máire Brennan	1952–	Irish	Clannad	
Phoebe Bridgers (Note: Some sources also refer to Bridgers as a contralto)	1994–	American	Boygenius; Better Oblivion Community Center; Sloppy Jane	
Sarah Brightman	1960–	English	Hot Gossip	
Danielle Brisebois	1969-	American	New Radicals	
Ally Brooke	1993–	American	Fifth Harmony	
Ashley Brown (Note: Brown is also referred to as a mezzo-soprano)	1982–	American		
Ane Brun	1976–	Norwegian		
Amalie Bruun	1985–	Danish	Myrkur	
Nanna Bryndís	1989–	Icelandic	Of Monsters and Men	
Keisha Buchanan	1984–	English	Sugababes; Mutya Keisha Siobhan	
Kate Bush	1958–	English		
Camila Cabello (Note: Cabello is also referred to as a mezzo-soprano)	1997–	Cuban-American	Fifth Harmony	
Dove Cameron	1996–	American		
Isobel Campbell	1976–	Scottish	Belle and Sebastian	
Laura Cantrell	1967–	American		
Mariah Carey (Note: Carey is also referred to as a contralto)	1969-	American		
Mairéad Carlin	1988-	Irish	Celtic Woman	
Belinda Carlisle	1958–	American	The Go-Go's	
Sabrina Carpenter	1999-	American		
Adriana Caselotti	1916–1997	American		
Eva Cassidy	1963–1996	American		
Kristin Chenoweth	1968– or 1970–	American		
Cherrelle	1958–	American		
Yuki Chikudate		Japanese-American	Asobi Seksu	
Rachel Chinouriri	1998–	English		
Choerry	2001–	South Korean	Loona; Odd Eye Circle; Artms	
Charlotte Church	1986–	Welsh		
Ciara	1985-	American		
Helen Clare	1916–2018	British		
Dodie Clark	1994 or 1995–	English		
Kelly Clarkson	1982–	American		
Cheryl Clemons	1970–	American	SWV	
Amber Coffman	1984–	American	Dirty Projectors; Sleeping People	
Keyshia Cole	1981–	American		
Judy Collins	1939–	American		
Barbara Cook	1927–2017	American		
Elizabeth Cook	1972–	American		
Mary Costa	1930–	American		
Samantha Crain	1986–	Choctaw		
Beverley Craven	1963–	British		
Allison Crowe	1981–	Canadian		
Katie Crutchfield	1989–	American	Waxahatchee; P.S. Eliot	
Marisa Dabice		American	Mannequin Pussy	
Sarah Dash	1945–2021	American	Labelle	
Skeeter Davis	1931–2004	American	The Davis Sisters	
Blossom Dearie	1924 or 1926–2009	American		
Kat DeLuna	1987–	Dominican-American		
Marcella Detroit	1952– or 1959–	American	Shakespears Sister	
Renée Diggs	1954–2005	American	Starpoint	
Cara Dillon	1975–	Northern Irish		
Celine Dion (Note: Dion is also referred to as a mezzo-soprano)	1968–	Canadian		
Doja Cat (Note: Doja Cat is also referred to as a mezzo-soprano)	1995–	American		
Arielle Dombasle	1953– or 1958–	American-French		
Diane Dufresne	1944–	Canadian		
Irene Dunne	1898–1990	American		
Deanna Durbin	1921–2013	Canadian		
Judith Durham	1943–2022	Australian	The Seekers	
Sheena Easton	1959–	Scottish		
Perrie Edwards	1993–	English	Little Mix	
Ejae	1991-	South Korean-American	Huntrix	
Hazel English	1990–	Australian-American		
Cynthia Erivo	1987-	English		
Jackie Evancho (Note: Some sources also refer to Evancho as a mezzo-soprano)	2000–	American		
Faith Evans	1973–	American		
Ali Ewoldt	1982–	Filipino-American		
Lara Fabian	1970–	Belgian-Canadian		
Marianne Faithfull	1946–2025	English		
Agnetha Fältskog	1950–	Swedish	ABBA	
Mylène Farmer	1961–	Canadian-French		
Leslie Feist	1976–	Canadian		
Connie Fisher	1983–	British		
Elizabeth Fraser	1963–	Scottish	Cocteau Twins	
Becky G	1997–	American		
Karol G	1991–	Colombian		
Any Gabrielly	2002–	Brazilian	Now United	
Diamanda Galás	1955–	American		
France Gall	1947–2018	French		
Crystal Gayle	1951– or 1954–	American		
Shreya Ghoshal	1984–	Indian		
Rhiannon Giddens	1974–	American	Carolina Chocolate Drops; The New Basement Tapes	
Gobbinjr		American		
Louise Goffin	1960–	American		
Alison Goldfrapp	1966–	English	Goldfrapp	
Vivien Goldman	1954–	British	The Flying Lizards	
Delta Goodrem	1984–	Australian		
Eydie Gormé	1928–2013	American		
Ellie Goulding	1986–	English		
Ariana Grande	1993–	American		
Vivian Green	1979–	American		
Patty Griffin	1964–	American		
Nanci Griffith	1953–2021	American		
Grimes	1988–	Canadian	Grimes	
Christina Grimmie	1994–2016	American		
Emily Haines (Note: Haines is also referred to as a contralto and a mezzo-soprano)	1974–	Canadian	Metric; Broken Social Scene	
Hana	1989–	American		
Emmylou Harris	1947–	American		
Annie Haslam	1947–	English	Renaissance	
Juliana Hatfield	1967–	American	Blake Babies; The Lemonheads; Some Girls; The Juliana Hatfield Three	
Tramaine Hawkins	1950– or 1957–	American		
Kirsty Hawkshaw	1969–	English	Opus III	
Ella Henderson	1996–	English		
Florence Henderson	1934–2016	American		
Erika Henningsen	1992-	American		
Katie Herzig	1980–	American		
Lynn Hilary	1982–	Irish	Celtic Woman	
Anne Hills	1953–	American		
Keri Hilson	1982–	American		
Megan Hilty	1981–	American		
Alison Hinds	1970–	Barbadian	Square One	
Hòa Minzy	1995–	Vietnamese		
Cissy Houston	1933–2024	American	The Sweet Inspirations; The Drinkard Singers	
Whitney Houston	1963–2012	American		
Hyelin	1993–	South Korean	EXID	
Sarah Hyland	1990–	American		
Natalie Imbruglia	1975–	Australian-British		
IU (Note: Some sources also refer to IU as a mezzo-soprano)	1993–	South Korean		
Elly Jackson	1988–	English	La Roux	
Floor Jansen	1981–	Dutch	Nightwish; After Forever; ReVamp; Star One	
Jill Janus	1975–2018	American	Huntress	
Jeongyeon (Note: Jeongyeon is also referred to as a mezzo soprano)	1996–	South Korean	Twice	
Carly Rae Jepsen	1985–	Canadian		
Jewel	1974–	American		
Jihyo	1997–	South Korean	Twice	
Jinsoul	1997–	South Korean	Loona; Odd Eye Circle; Artms	
Joan As Police Woman	1970–	American	The Dambuilders	
Jeanne Jolly		American		
Becky "Saint Saviour" Jones	1982 or 1983–	English		
Shirley Jones	1934–	American		
Sheri Jones-Moffett	1974–	American	Ted & Sheri	
Joy	1996–	South Korean	Red Velvet	
Valerie June (Note: Some sources also refer to June as a mezzo-soprano)	1982–	American		
Jessica Jung	1989–	Korean-American	Girls' Generation	
Juniel	1993–	South Korean		
Madeline Kahn	1942–1999	American		
Lena Katina	1984–	Russian	t.A.T.u.	
Morgan Keene	1996 or 1997–	American	DCappella	
Kehlani	1995–	American	Poplyfe	
Kei	1995–	South Korean	Lovelyz	
Lisa Kelly	1977–	Irish	Celtic Woman	
Tori Kelly	1992–	American		
Anna Kendrick	1985–	American		
Star Kendrick		Australian	Geowulf	
Rachel Kerr		British		
Nicole Kidman	1967–	American-Australian		
Kiesza	1989–	Canadian		
Kim Lip	1999–	South Korean	Loona; Odd Eye Circle; Artms	
Elle King (Note: King is also referred to as a contralto)	1989–	American		
Solange Knowles	1986–	American		
Alison Krauss	1971–	American		
Liv Kristine	1976–	Norwegian	Theatre of Tragedy; Leaves' Eyes	
Judy Kuhn	1958–	American		
Sissel Kyrkjebø	1969–	Norwegian		
Patti LaBelle	1944–	American	Labelle	
Natalia Lafourcade	1989–	Mexican		
Kyla La Grange	1986–	English		
Mary Lambert	1989–	American		
Zara Larsson	1997–	Swedish		
Cyndi Lauper	1953–	American		
Avril Lavigne	1984–	Canadian		
Gertrude Lawrence	1898–1952	English		
Vicky Leandros	1949– or 1952–	Greek		
Jess Lee	1988–	Malaysian		
Ravyn Lenae	1999–	American	Zero Fatigue	
Adrianne Lenker	1991–	American	Big Thief	
Ari Lennox	1991–	American		
Lykke Li	1986–	Swedish	Liv	
Lights	1987–	Canadian		
Lina	1984–	South Korean	Isak N Jiyeon; The Grace	
Tove Lo	1987–	Swedish		
Lisa Lobsinger		Canadian	Reverie Sound Revue; Broken Social Scene	
Lisa Loeb	1968–	American	Liz and Lisa	
LeToya Luckett	1981–	American	Destiny's Child	
Rebecca Luker	1961–2020	American		
Luna	1993–	South Korean	f(x)	
Natalie Maines	1974–	American	The Chicks	
Aimee Mann	1960–	American	'Til Tuesday; The Both	
Sarah Masen	1975–	American		
Jessie Matthews	1907–1981	British		
Lauren Mayberry (Note: Some sources also refer to Mayberry as a contralto)	1987–	Scottish	Chvrches	
Marin Mazzie	1960–2018	American		
Martina McBride	1966–	American		
Maureen McGovern	1949–	American		
Frances McKee	1966–	Scottish	Suckle; The Vaselines	
Loreena McKennitt	1957–	Canadian		
Tate McRae	2003–	Canadian		
Janet Mead	1937–2022	Australian		
Tift Merritt	1975–	American		
Ingrid Michaelson	1979–	American		
Lea Michele (Note: Michele is also referred to as a mezzo-soprano)	1986–	American		
Kate Miller-Heidke	1981–	Australian		
Milva	1939–2021	Italian		
Christina Milian	1981–	American		
Stephanie Mills	1957–	American		
Kylie Minogue	1968–	Australian		
Minzy	1994–	South Korean	2NE1	
Ruth Moody		Australian-Canadian	The Wailin' Jennys	
Abra Moore	1969–	American	Poi Dog Pondering	
Alaina Moore	1985–	American	Tennis	
Chanté Moore	1967–	American		
Melba Moore	1945–	American		
Teedra Moses	1976–	American		
Nana Mouskouri	1934–	Greek		
Nicole C. Mullen	1967–	American		
Kacey Musgraves (Note: Musgraves is also referred to as a mezzo-soprano)	1988–	American		
Youn Sun Nah	1969–	South Korean		
Leigh Nash	1976–	American	Fauxliage; Sixpence None the Richer	
Ultra Naté	1970–	American		
Nayeon	1995–	South Korean	Twice	
Jesy Nelson	1991–	British	Little Mix	
Nina Nelson	1998-	American	Citizen Queen	
Juice Newton	1952–	American		
Olivia Newton-John	1948–2022	British-Australian		
Candice Night	1971–	American	Blackmore's Night; Rainbow	
Chhom Nimol		Cambodian-American	Dengue Fever	
Nivea	1982–	American		
Bernie Nolan	1960–2013	Irish-English	The Nolans	
Christiane Noll	1968–	American		
Terri Nunn	1961–	American	Berlin	
Lene Nystrøm	1973–	Norwegian	Aqua	
Karen O	1978–	American	Yeah Yeah Yeahs	
Aoife O'Donovan	1982–	American	I'm With Her; Crooked Still	
Esther Ofarim	1941–	Israelian		
Kelli O'Hara	1976–	American		
Paige O'Hara	1956–	American		
Sally Oldfield	1947–	Irish	The Sallyangie	
Marie Osmond	1959–	American	The Osmonds	
Laura Osnes	1985–	American		
LaShun Pace	1961–2022	American		
Ashley Park	1991–	American		
Karin Park	1978–	Swedish-Norwegian		
Rosé Park	1997–	New Zealand-South Korean	Blackpink	
Dolly Parton	1946–2026	American		
Heidi Parviainen	1979–	Finnish	Amberian Dawn; Dark Sarah	
Sandi Patty	1956–	American		
Nina Persson	1974–	Swedish	The Cardigans	
Bernadette Peters	1948–	American		
Maisie Peters	2000–	English		
Michelle Phillips	1944–	American	The Mamas and the Papas	
Kellie Pickler	1986–	American		
PinkPantheress	2001–	British		
Leigh-Anne Pinnock	1991–	English-Jamaican	Little Mix	
Laura Pitt-Pulford (Note: Pitt-Pulford is also referred to as a mezzo-soprano)		English		
Caroline Polachek (Note: Polachek is also referred to as a mezzo-soprano)	1985–	American	Chairlift	
Eimear Quinn	1972–	Irish	Anúna	
Addison Rae	2000–	American		
Reneé Rapp	2000–	American		
Raye (Note: Raye is also referred to as a contralto and a mezzo-soprano)	1997–	British		
Della Reese	1931–2017	American		
Meghan Remy (Note: Remy is also referred to as a mezzo-soprano)	1984– or 1985–	Canadian	U.S. Girls	
Jessie Reyez	1991–	Canadian		
Zoe Reynolds		American	Kississippi	
LeAnn Rimes	1982–	American		
Minnie Riperton	1947–1979	American	Rotary Connection	
Chappell Roan	1998-	American		
Robyn	1979– or 1981–	Swedish		
Lucy Wainwright Roche	1981–	American	The Wainwright Sisters	
Terre Roche	1953–	American	The Roches	
Kate Rockwell	1984–	American		
Olivia Rodrigo	2003–	American		
Bahja Rodriguez	1997– or 1998–	American	OMG Girlz	
Lorely "Empress Of" Rodriguez (Note: Some sources also refer to Rodriguez as a mezzo-soprano)	1989–	American		
Linda Ronstadt	1946–	American	Stone Poneys	
Caitlin Rose	1987–	American		
Annie Ross	1930–2020	British-American	Lambert, Hendricks & Ross	
Diana Ross	1944–	American	The Supremes	
Emmy Rossum	1986–	American		
Antonella Ruggiero	1952–	Italian	Matia Bazar	
Kate Rusby	1973–	English	The Poozies; Equation	
Patrice Rushen	1954–	American	CAB	
Giuni Russo	1951–2004	Italian		
Elize Ryd	1984–	Swedish	Amaranthe	
Jessica Sanchez	1995–	Filipino-American		
Emeli Sandé	1987–	British		
Sandy	1983–	Brazilian	Sandy & Junior	
Ariana Savalas	1986 or 1987–	American		
Rina Sawayama	1990–	Japanese-English	Lazy Lion	
Noelle Scaggs	1979–	American	Fitz and the Tantrums	
Nicole Scherzinger	1978–	American	The Pussycat Dolls; Days of the New; Eden's Crush	
Jill Scott	1972–	American		
Cristina Scuccia	1988–	Italian		
Sejeong	1996–	South Korean	I.O.I; Gugudan; Gugudan SeMiNa	
Selena	1971–1995	American	Selena y Los Dinos	
Keala Settle	1975–	American		
Amanda Seyfried	1985–	American		
Alison Shaw		British	Cranes	
Karen Clark Sheard	1960–	American	The Clark Sisters	
Elina Siirala	1983–	Finnish	Leaves' Eyes	
Alexandra Silber	1983–	American		
Jessica Simpson	1980–	American		
Helen Sjöholm	1970–	Swedish		
Skin	1967–	English	Skunk Anansie	
Jorja Smith (Note: Smith is also referred to as a mezzo-soprano)	1997–	English		
Ruby Jane Smith	1994–	American		
Sy Smith	1978–	American	The Brand New Heavies	
Patty Smyth	1957–	American	Scandal	
Simone Simons	1985–	Dutch	Epica	
Sohyang	1978–	South Korean	POS	
Kyllikki Solanterä	1908–1965	Finnish		
Solji	1989–	South Korean	EXID	
Phillipa Soo	1990–	American		
Soyou	1992–	South Korean	Sistar	
Esperanza Spalding	1984–	American		
Eva Spence	1990–	English	Rolo Tomassi	
Vibeke Stene	1978–	Norwegian	Tristania	
Julia Stone	1984–	Australian	Angus & Julia Stone	
Tara Strong	1973–	Canadian-American		
Yma Sumac	1922 or 1923–2008	Peruvian		
Sunny	1989–	South Korean	Girls' Generation; Oh!GG	
Taeyeon	1989–	South Korean	Girls' Generation	
Becky Jean "Riva" Taylor	1988 or 1989–	English		
Tei Shi	1989–	Canadian		
Mica Tenenbaum	1995–	American	Magdalena Bay	
Thái Thanh	1934–2020	Vietnamese-American		
Jade Thirlwall	1992–	British	Little Mix	
Melody Thornton	1984–	American	The Pussycat Dolls	
Hebe Tien	1983–	Taiwanese	S.H.E	
Tinashe	1993–	American	The Stunners	
Pia Toscano	1988–	American		
Tarja Turunen	1977–	Finnish	Nightwish	
FKA Twigs	1988–	English		
Ana Paula Valadão	1976–	Brazilian	Diante do Trono	
Colet Vergara	2001–	Filipino	Bini	
Vérité	1990–	American		
Jonalyn Viray	1989–	Filipino	La Diva	
Anna von Hausswolff	1986–	Swedish		
Hannah Waddingham	1976–	English		
Susanna Wallumrød	1979–	Norwegian	Magical Orchestra	
Martha Wash	1953–	American	The Weather Girls; C+C Music Factory	
Sara Watkins	1981–	American	I'm With Her; Nickel Creek	
Emma Watson	1990–	English		
Wendy	1994–	South Korean	Red Velvet	
Carla Werner	1974/1975–	New Zealand		
Emily West	1981–	American		
Hayley Westenra	1987–	New Zealand	Celtic Woman	
Deniece Williams	1950–	American	Wonderlove	
Hayley Williams	1988–	American	Paramore	
Lucinda Williams	1953–	American		
Marion Williams	1927–1994	American		
Michelle Williams	1980–	American	Destiny's Child	
Vanessa Williams	1963–	American		
Kelly Willis	1968–	American		
Ann Wilson	1950–	American	Heart	
Betsy Wolfe	1982–	American		
Chelsea Wolfe	1983–	American		
Hollis Wong-Wear	1987–	American	The Flavr Blue	
Keke Wyatt	1982–	American	The Dolls	
Alisa Xayalith	1986–	New Zealand	The Naked and Famous	
Yiren	2000–	Chinese	Everglow	
Yoonjo	1992–	South Korean	Hello Venus	
Younha	1988–	South Korean		
Yuna	1986–	Malaysian		
María Zardoya	1994–	Puerto Rican-American	The Marías	
Michelle Zauner	1989–	American	Japanese Breakfast	
Rachel Zeffira	1983–	Canadian	Cat's Eyes	
Rachel Zegler	2001–	American		
Julie Zenatti	1981–	French		
Jane Zhang	1984–	Chinese		
Norma Zimmer	1923–2011	American	The Lawrence Welk Show	
Darlene Zschech	1965–	Australian	Hillsong Worship	

== See also ==
- List of contraltos in non-classical music
- List of mezzo-sopranos in non-classical music
- List of basses in non-classical music
- List of baritones in non-classical music
- List of tenors in non-classical music
- Types and roles of sopranos in opera
- Voice classification in non-classical music
- Voice type
