= List of baritones in non-classical music =

The baritone voice is typically written in the range from the second G below middle C to the G above middle C (G_{2}–G_{4}) although it can be extended at either end. However, the baritone voice is determined not only by its vocal range, but also by its timbre, which tends to be darker than that of the typical tenor voice.

The term baritone was developed in relation to classical and operatic voices, where the classification is based not merely on the singer's vocal range but also on the tessitura and timbre of the voice. For classical and operatic singers, their voice type determines the roles they will sing and is a primary method of categorization. In non-classical music, singers are defined by their genre and their gender and not by their vocal range. When the terms soprano, mezzo-soprano, contralto, tenor, baritone, and bass are used as descriptors of non-classical voices, they are applied more loosely than they would be to those of classical singers and generally refer only to the singer's perceived vocal range.

Successful non-classical baritones display a wide range of vocal qualities and effects that lend a unique character to their voices, many of which are considered undesirable in the operatic or classical baritone singer, such as "breathy" (Jim Reeves), "distinguished…crooner" (Ville Valo), "growling" (Neil Diamond), and even "ragged" (Bruce Springsteen).

The following is a list of singers in various music genres and styles (most of which can be found on the List of popular music genres) who have been described as baritones.

== List of names ==
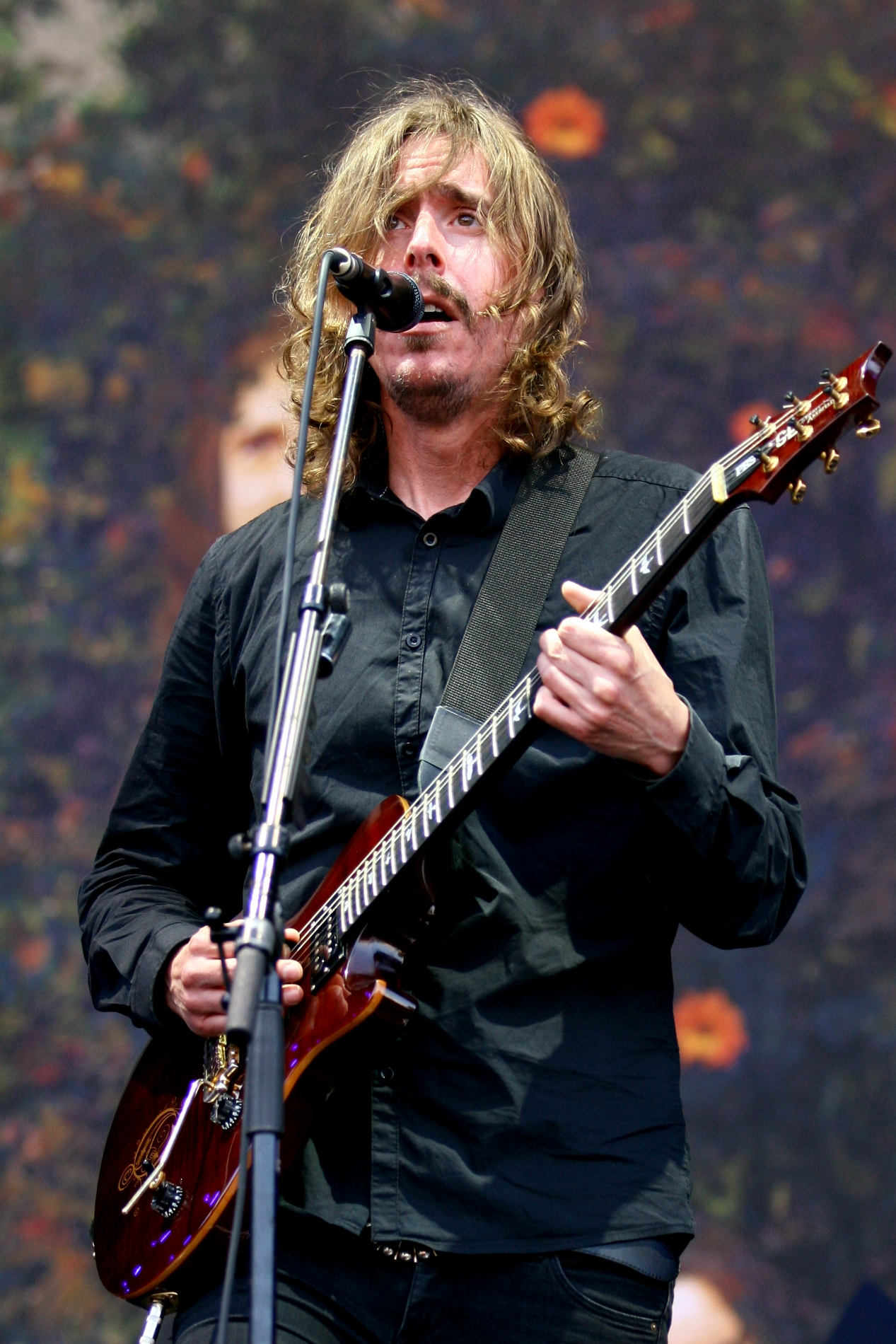
Mikael Åkerfeldt

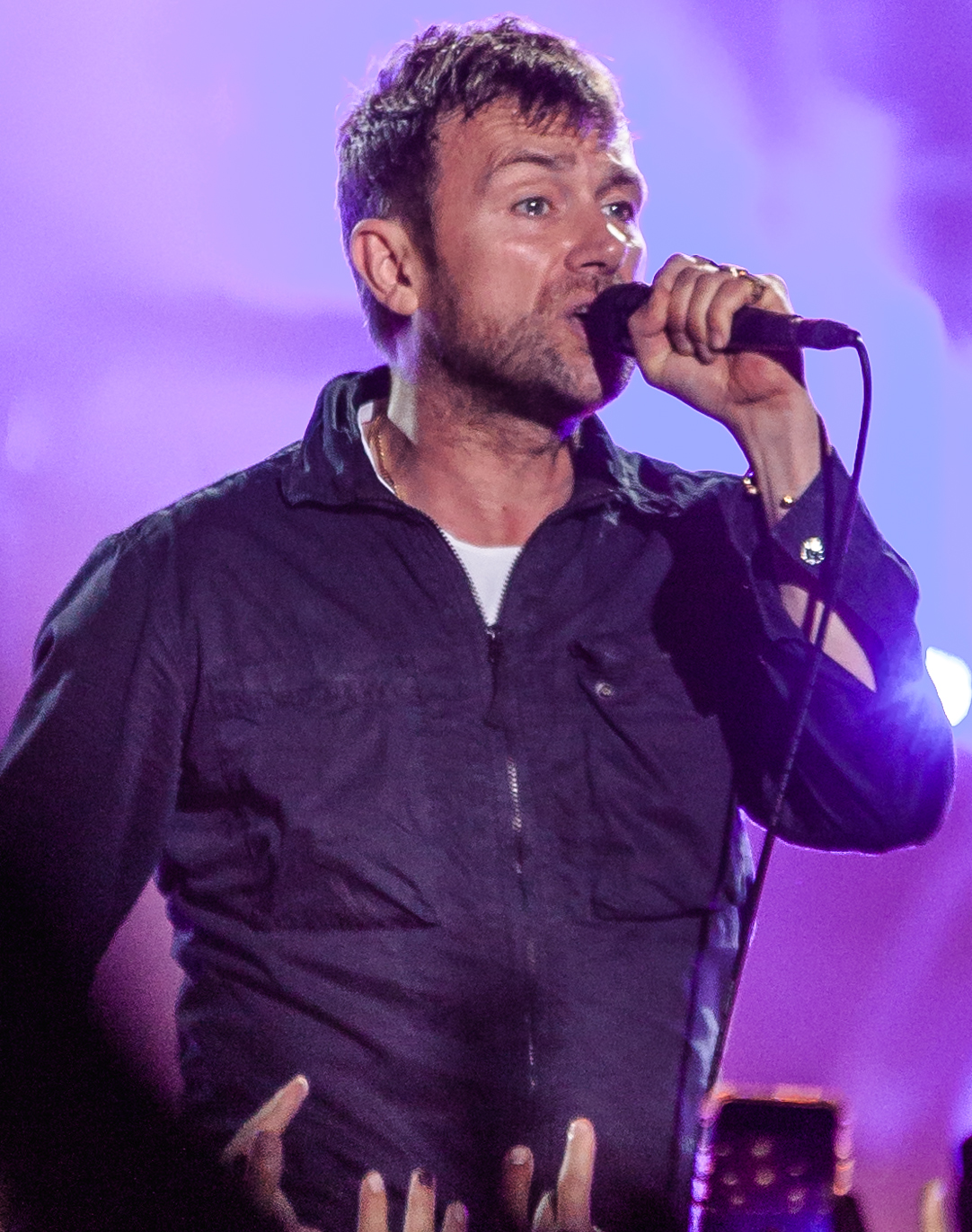
Damon Albarn

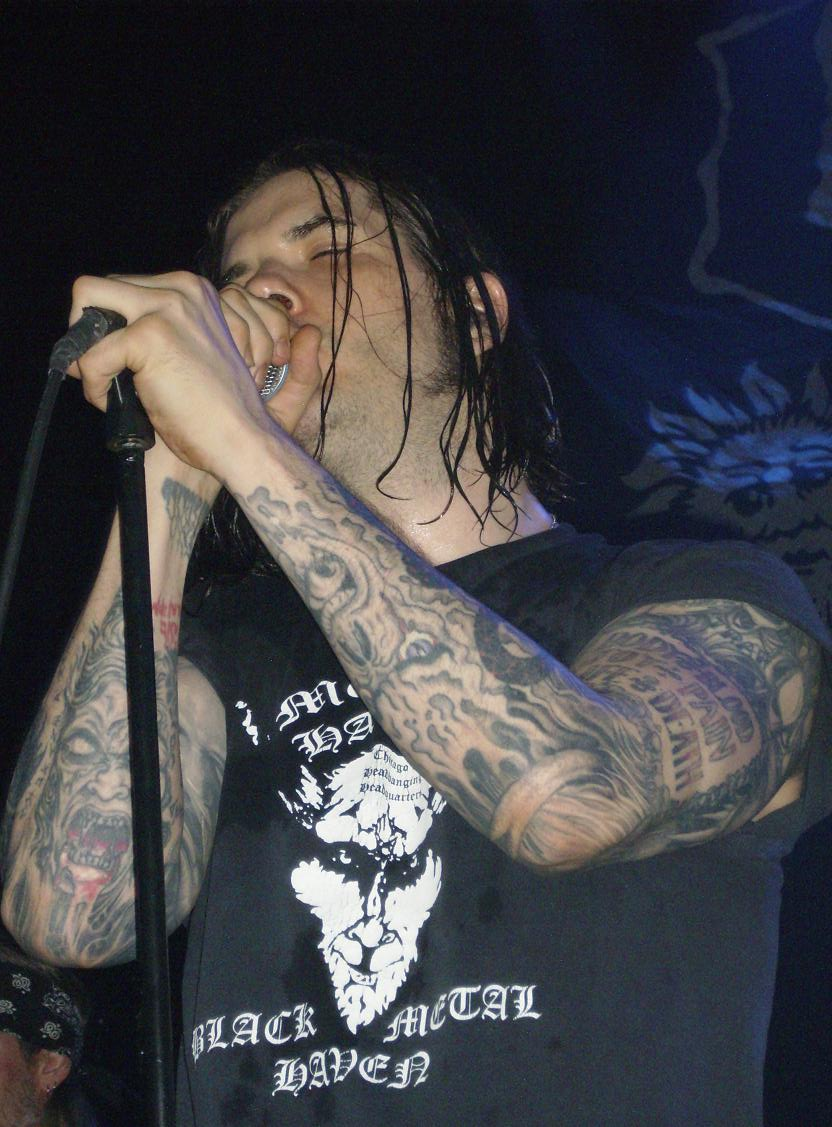
Phil Anselmo

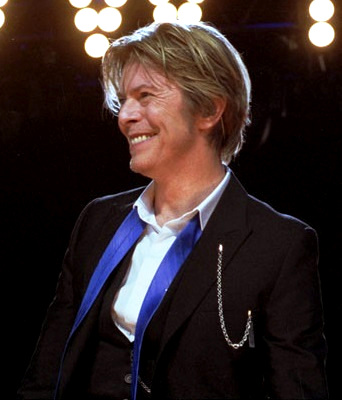
David Bowie

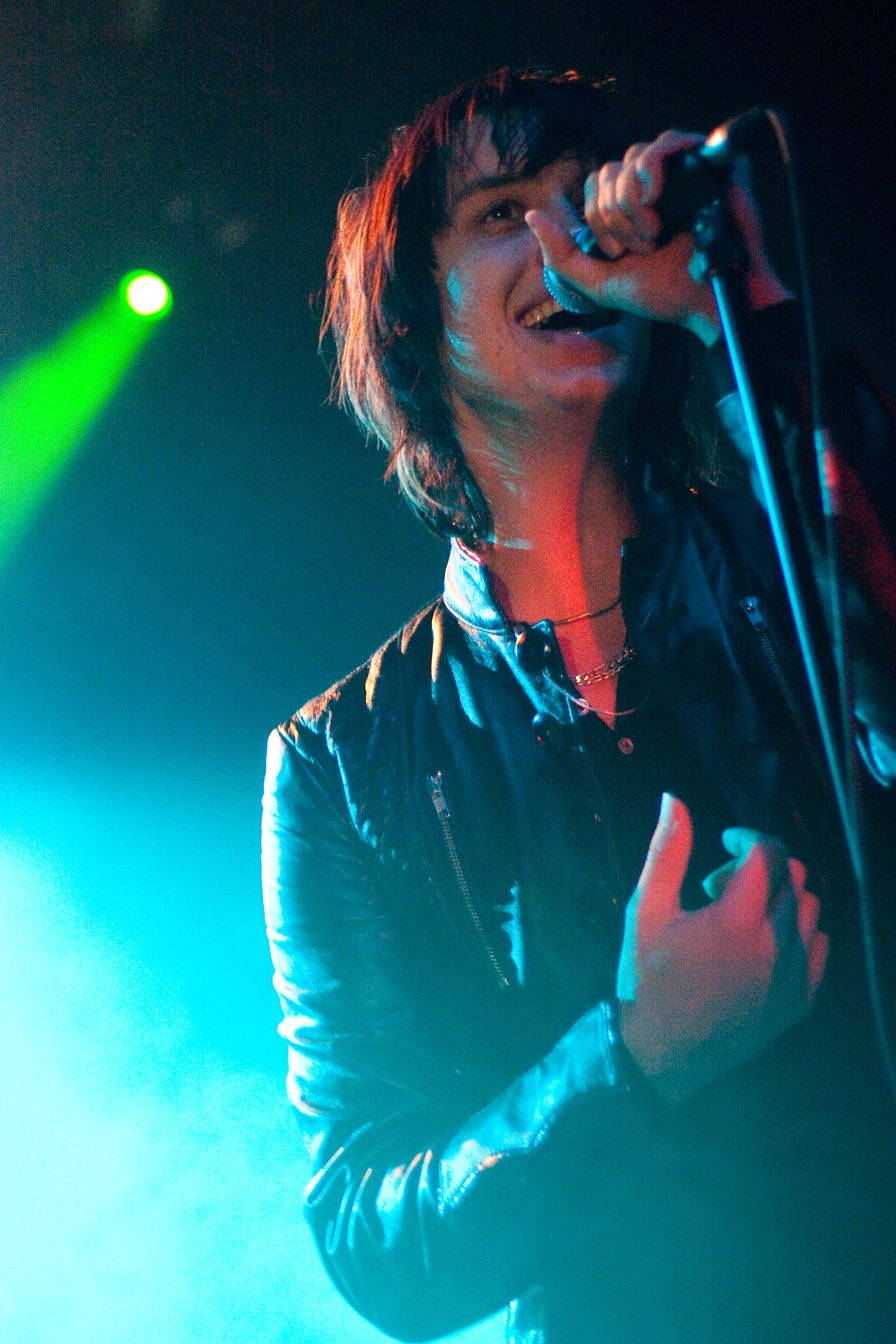
Julian Casablancas

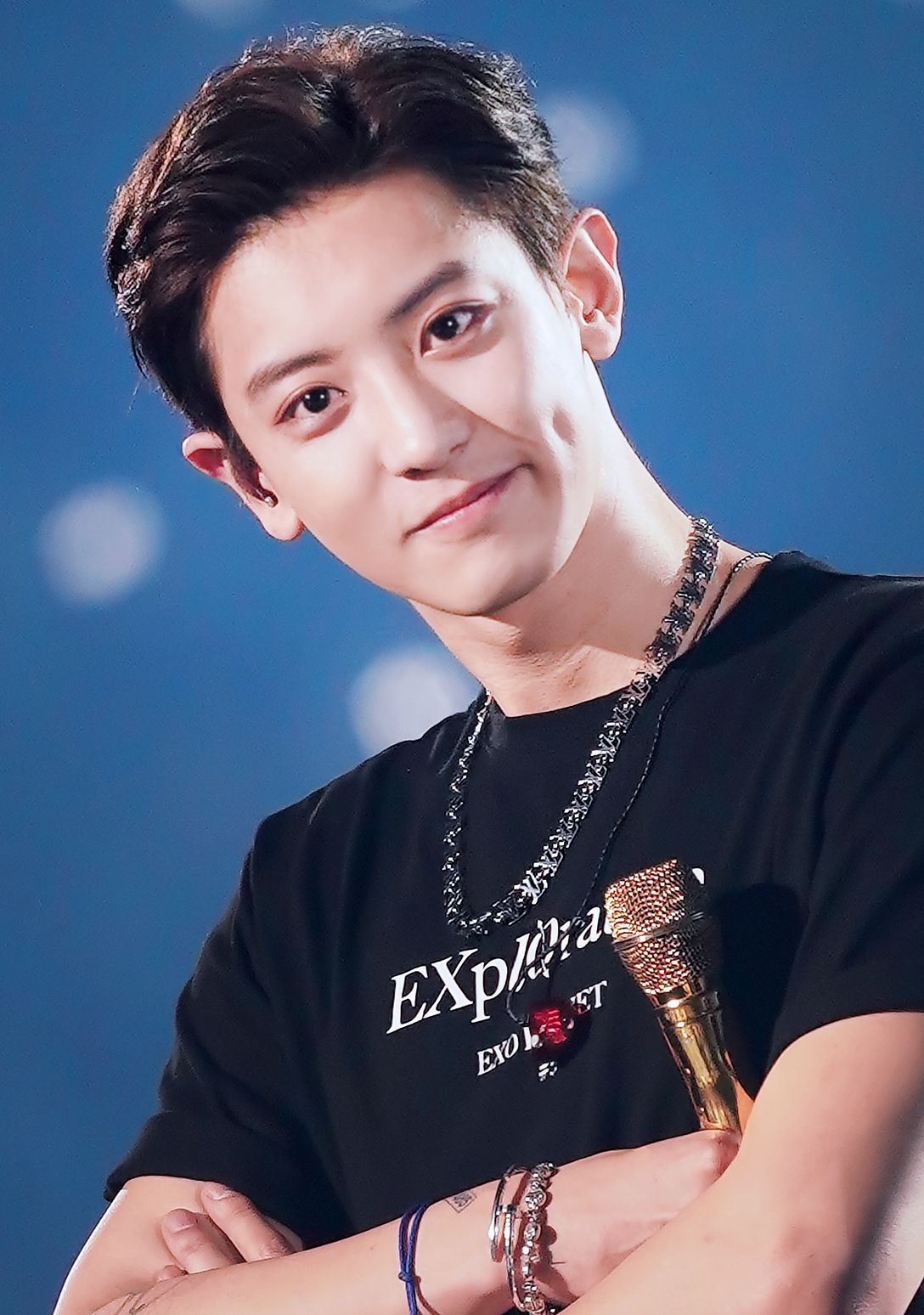
Park Chanyeol

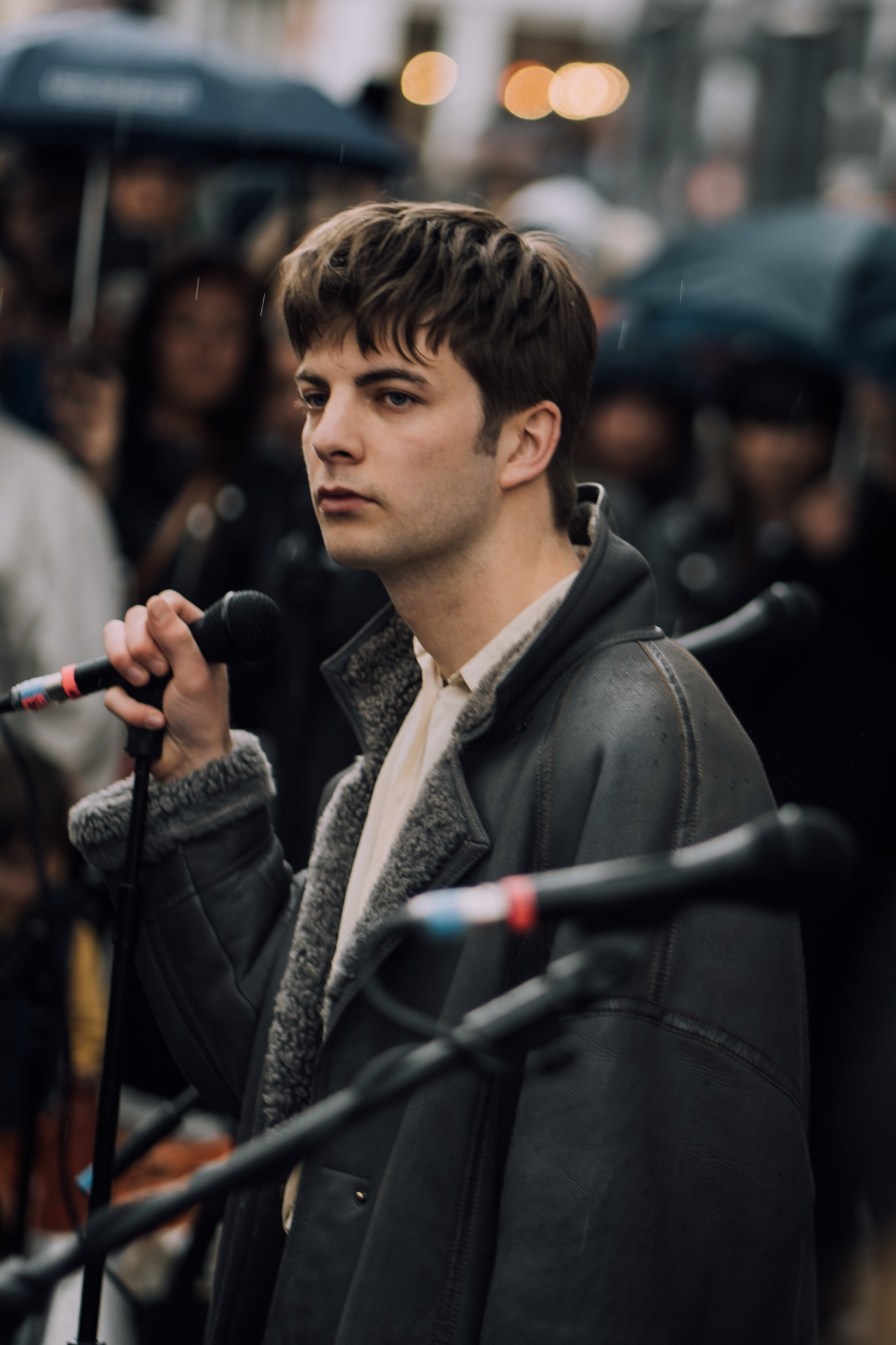
Grian Chatten

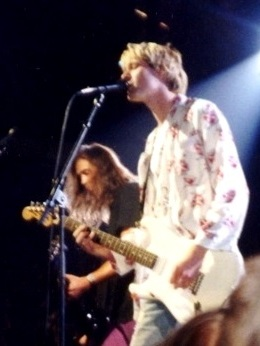
Kurt Cobain

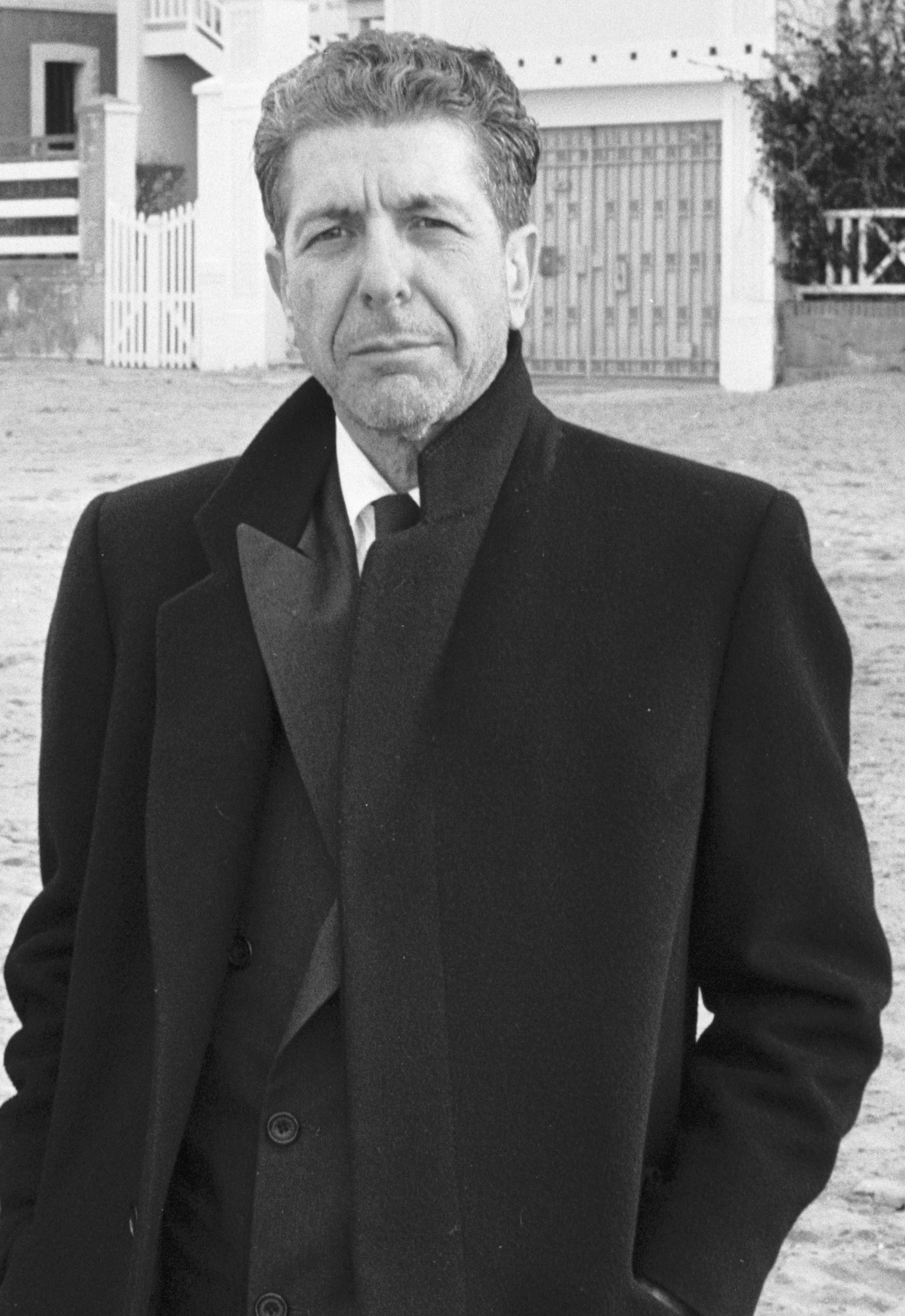
Leonard Cohen

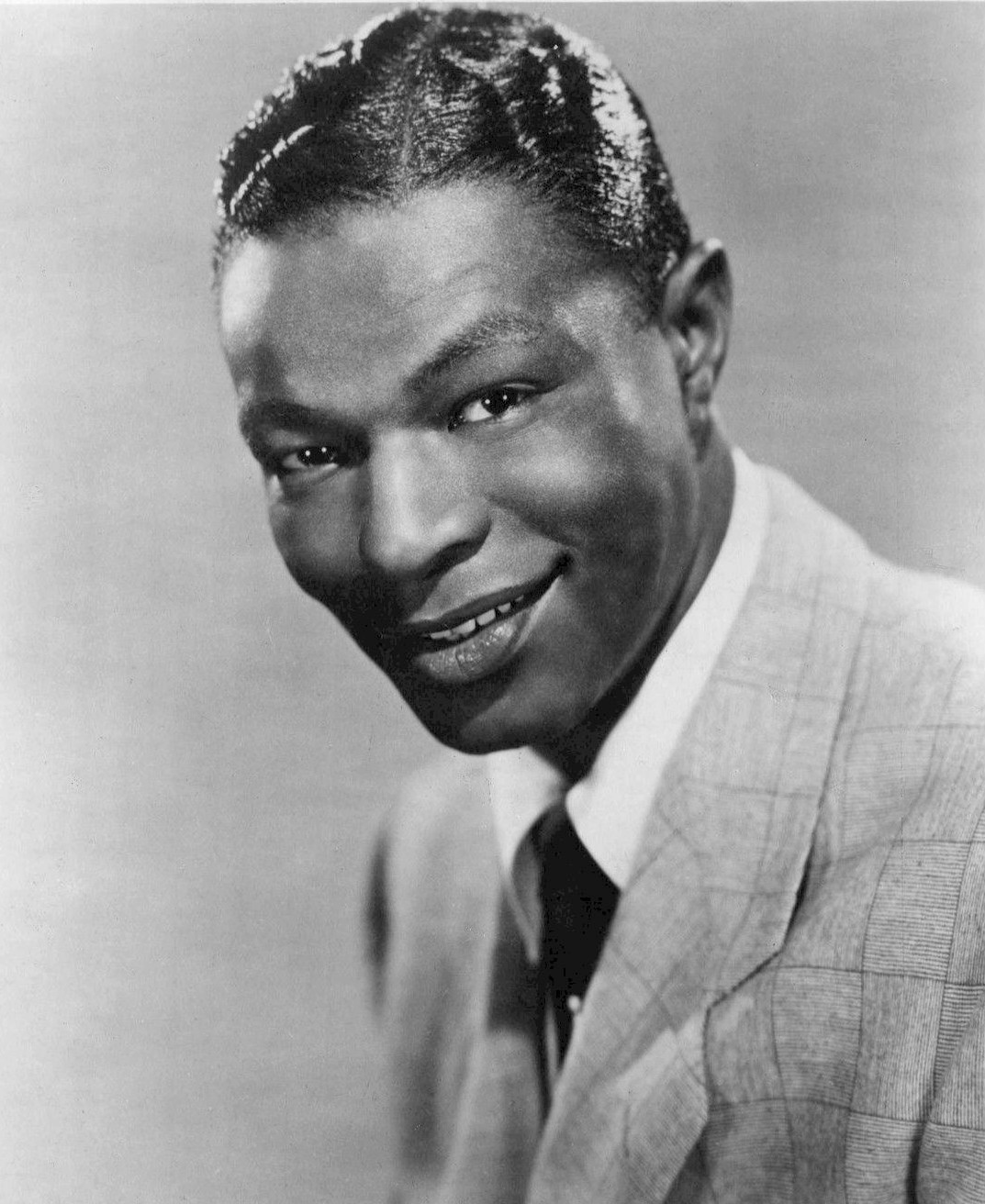
Nat King Cole

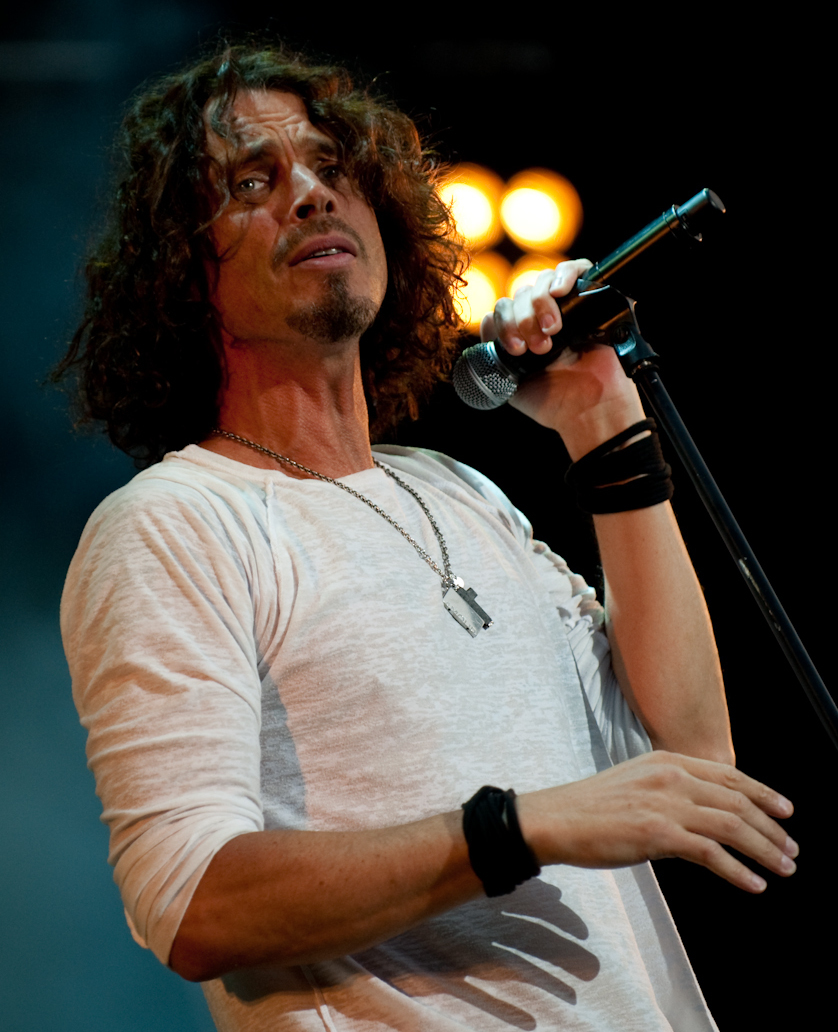
Chris Cornell

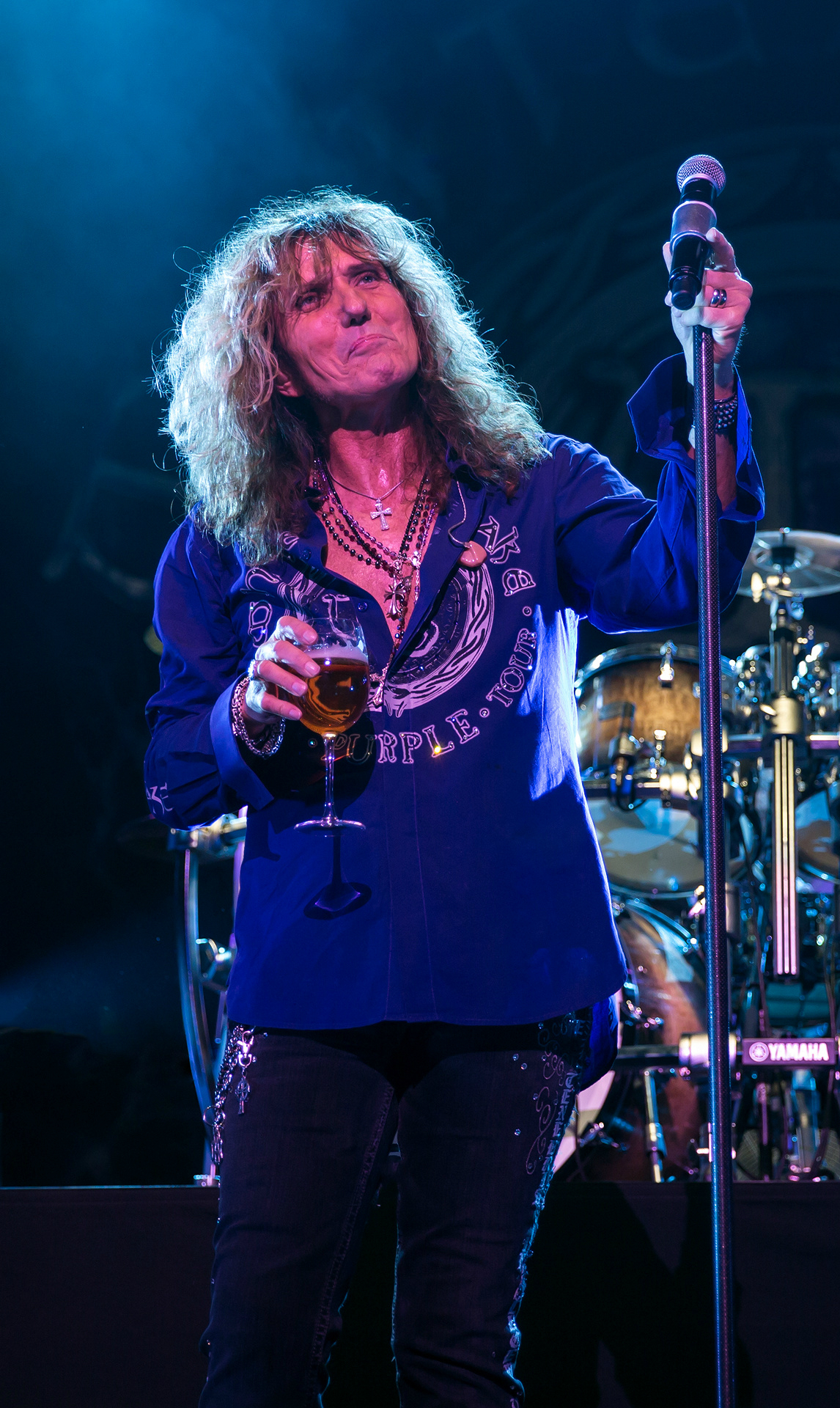
David Coverdale

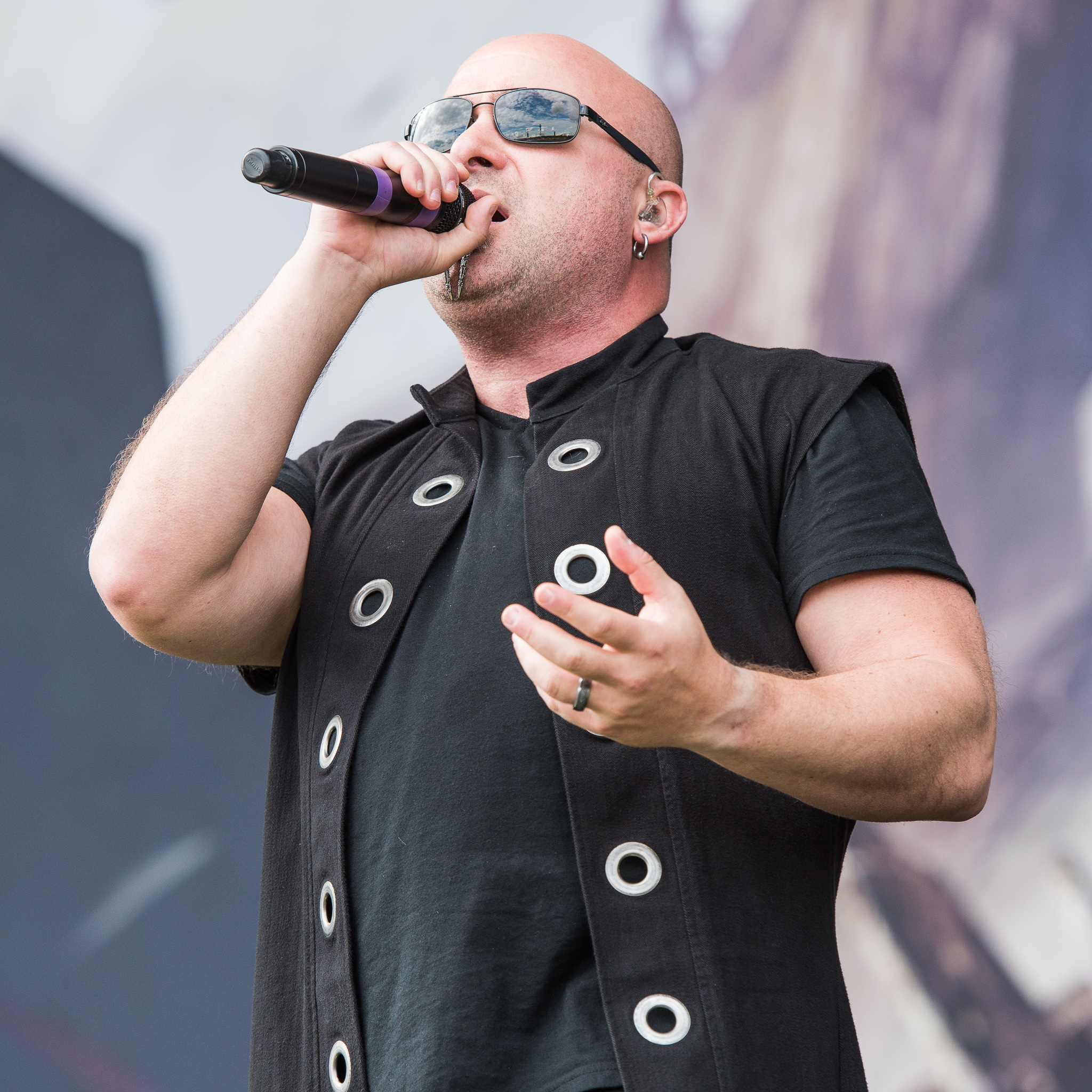
David Draiman

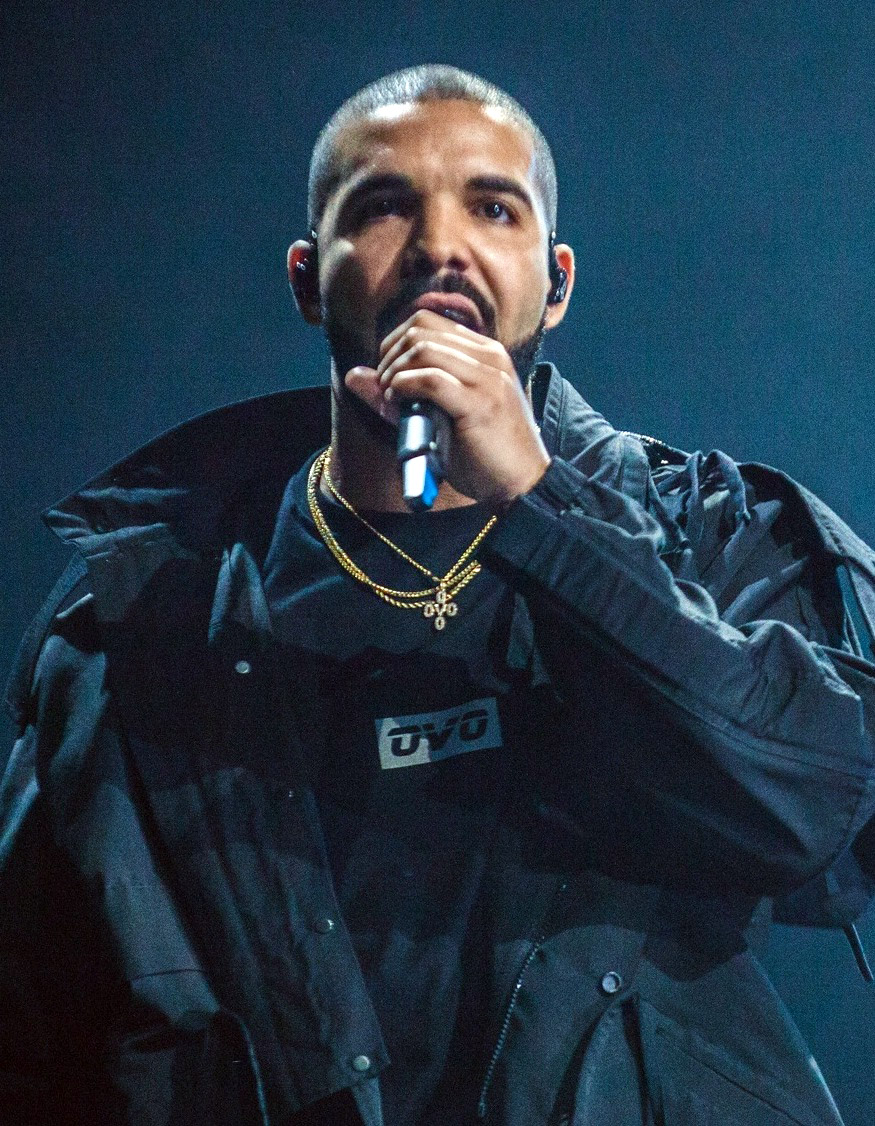
Drake

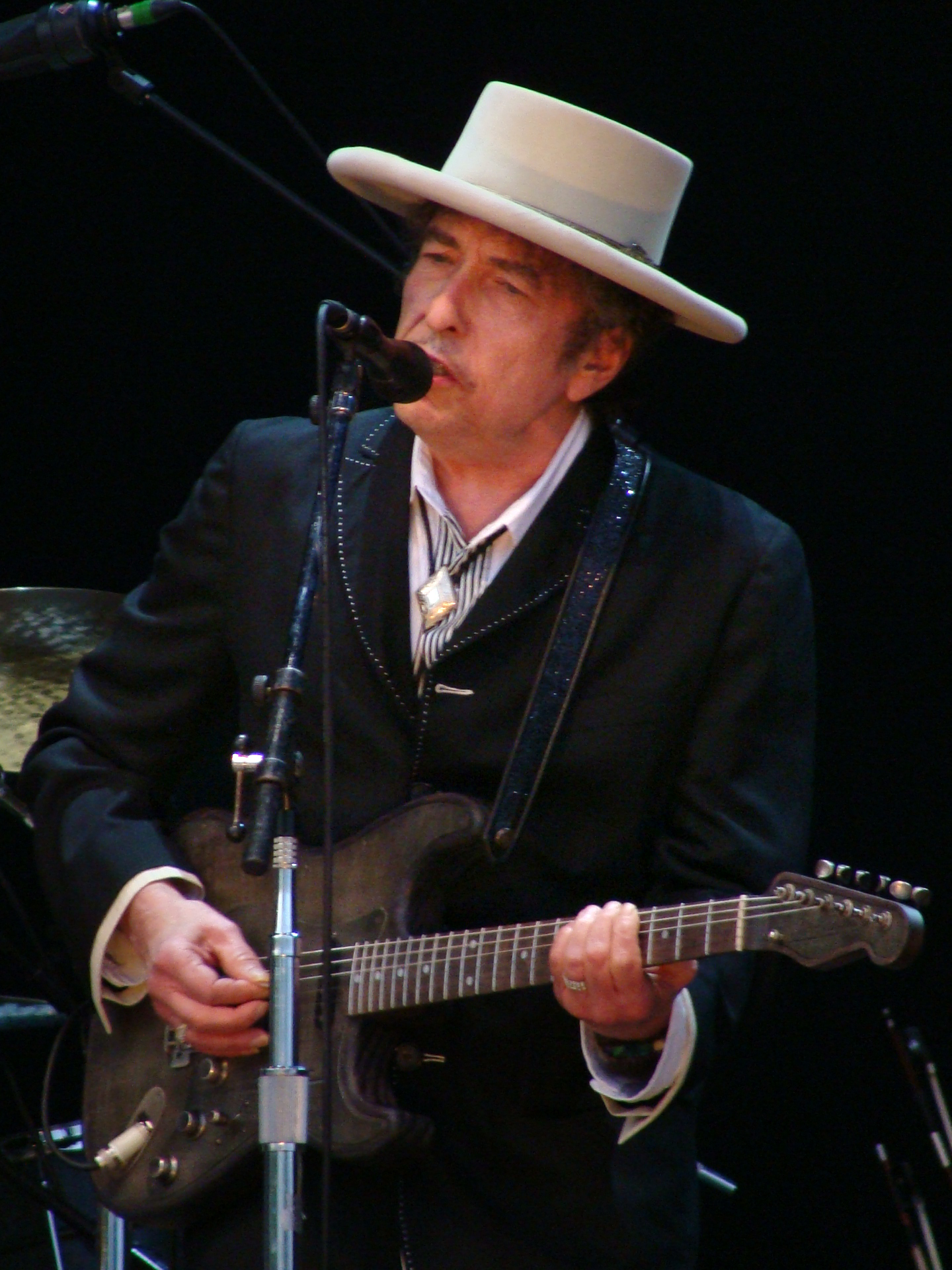
Bob Dylan

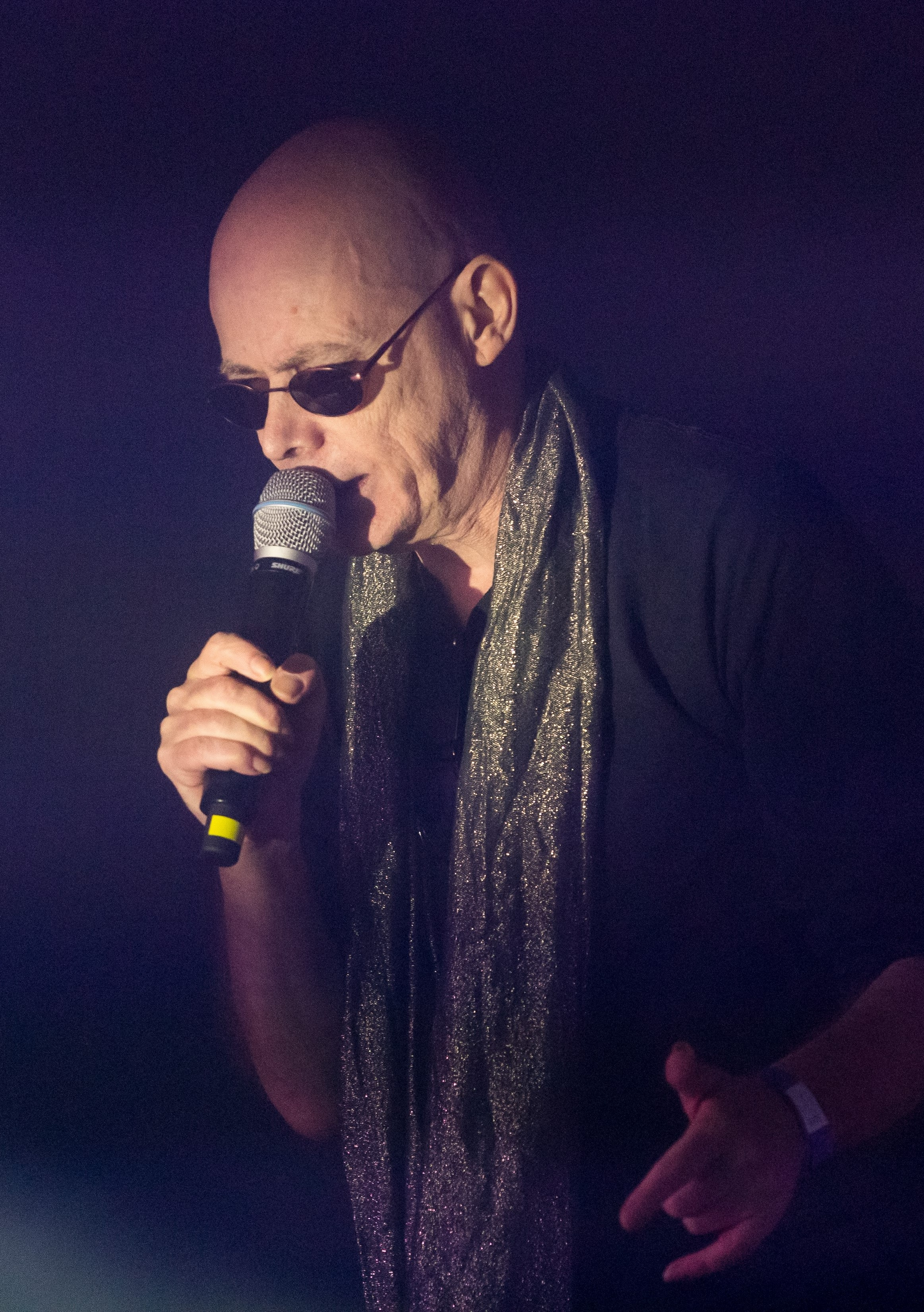
Andrew Eldritch

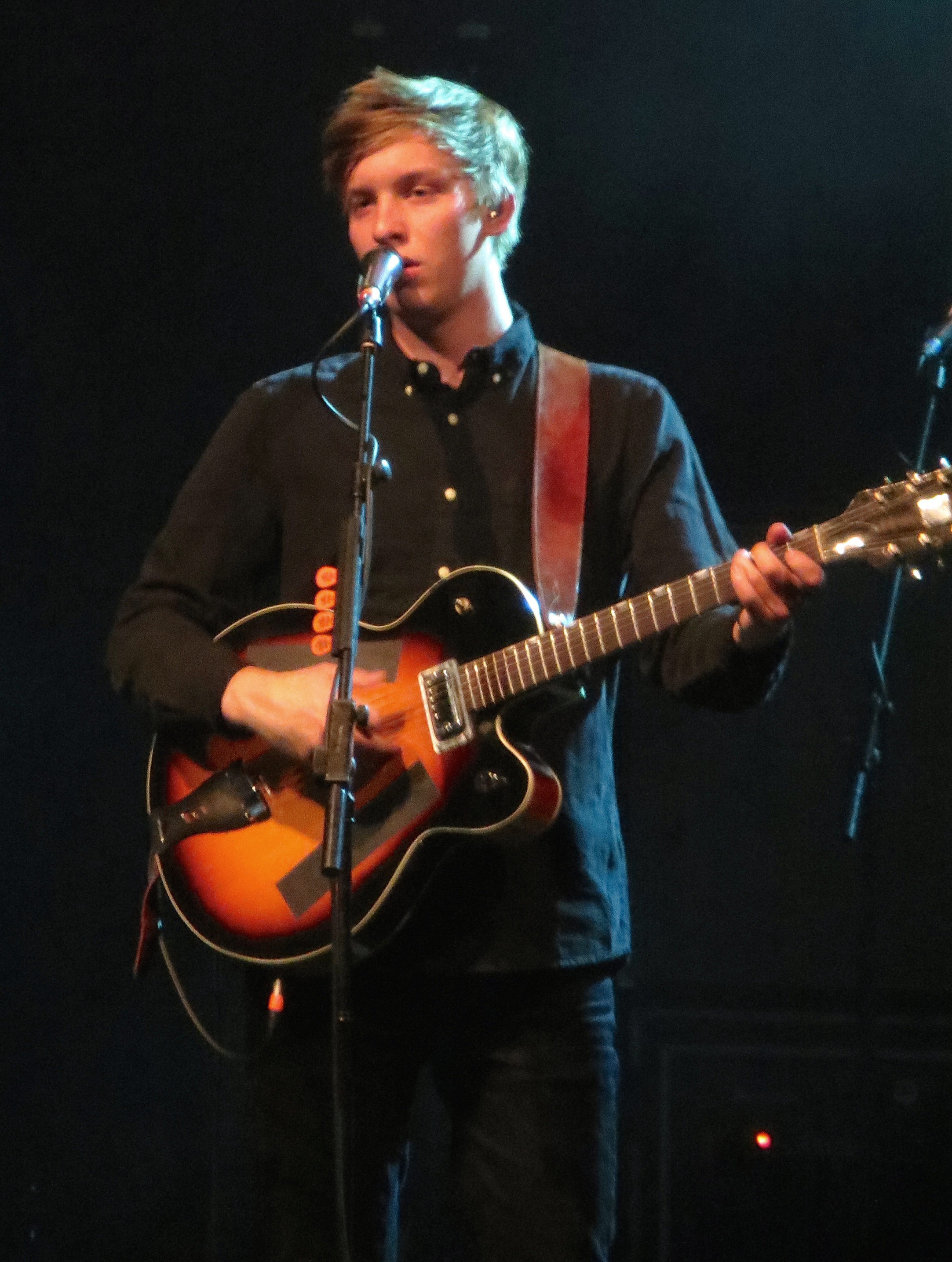
George Ezra

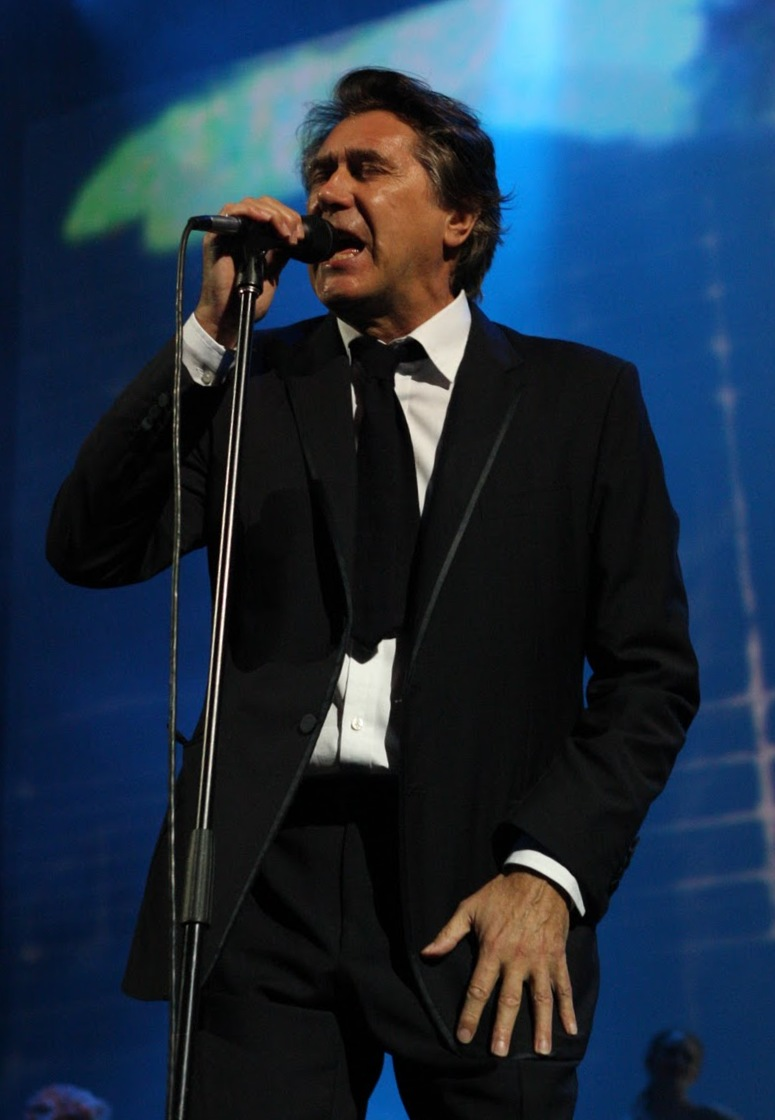
Bryan Ferry

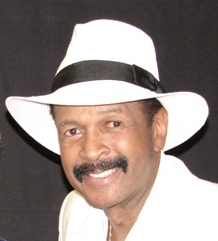
Larry Graham

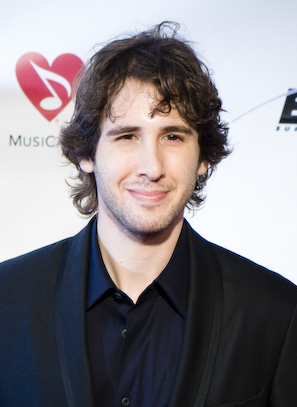
Josh Groban

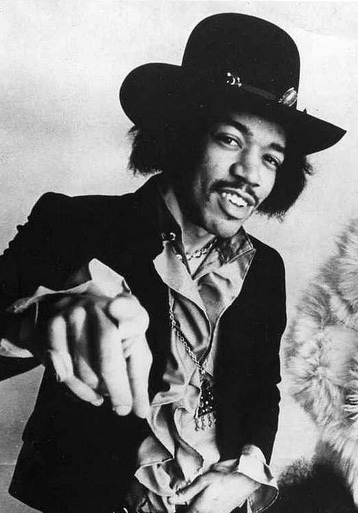
Jimi Hendrix

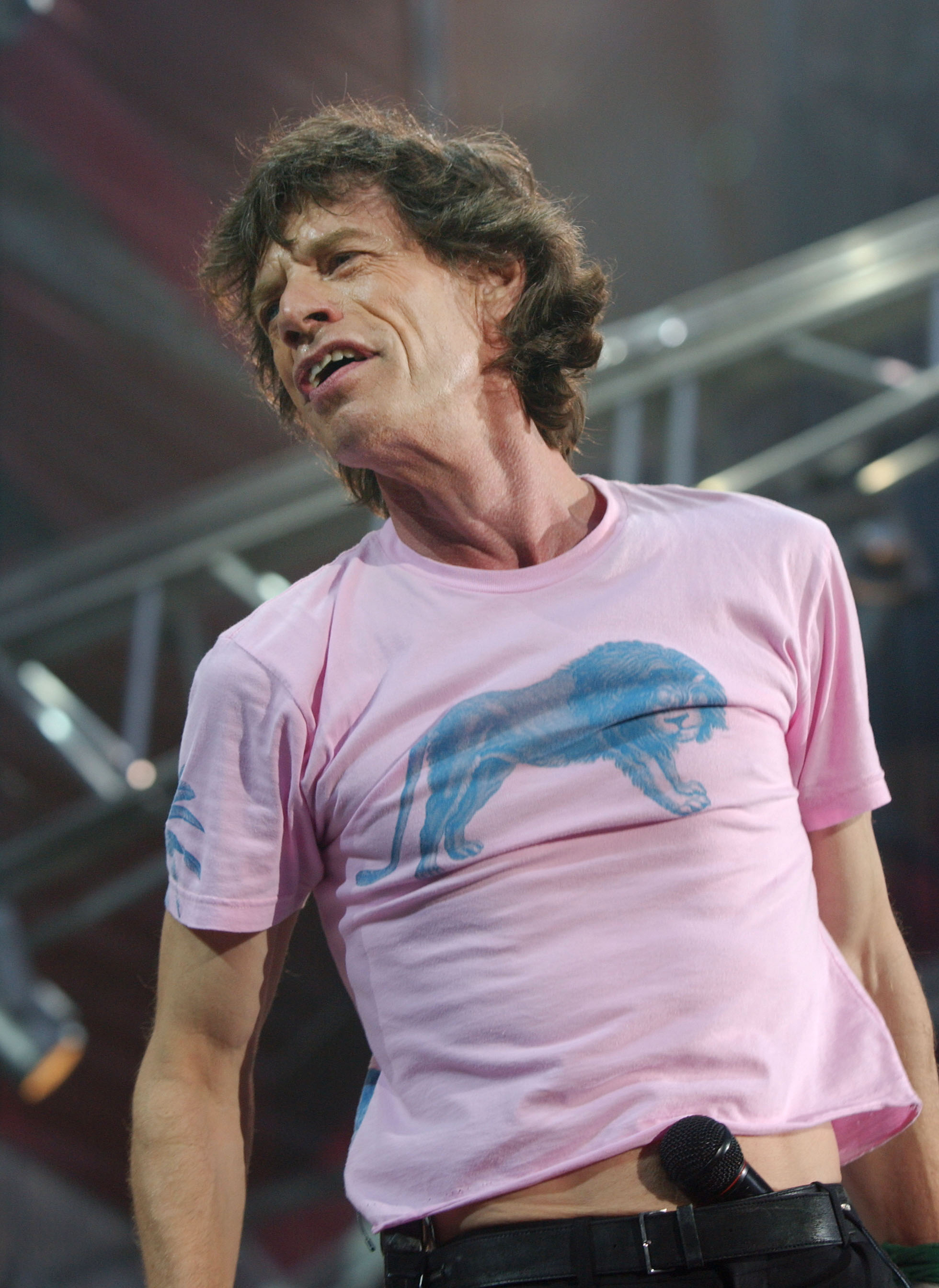
Mick Jagger

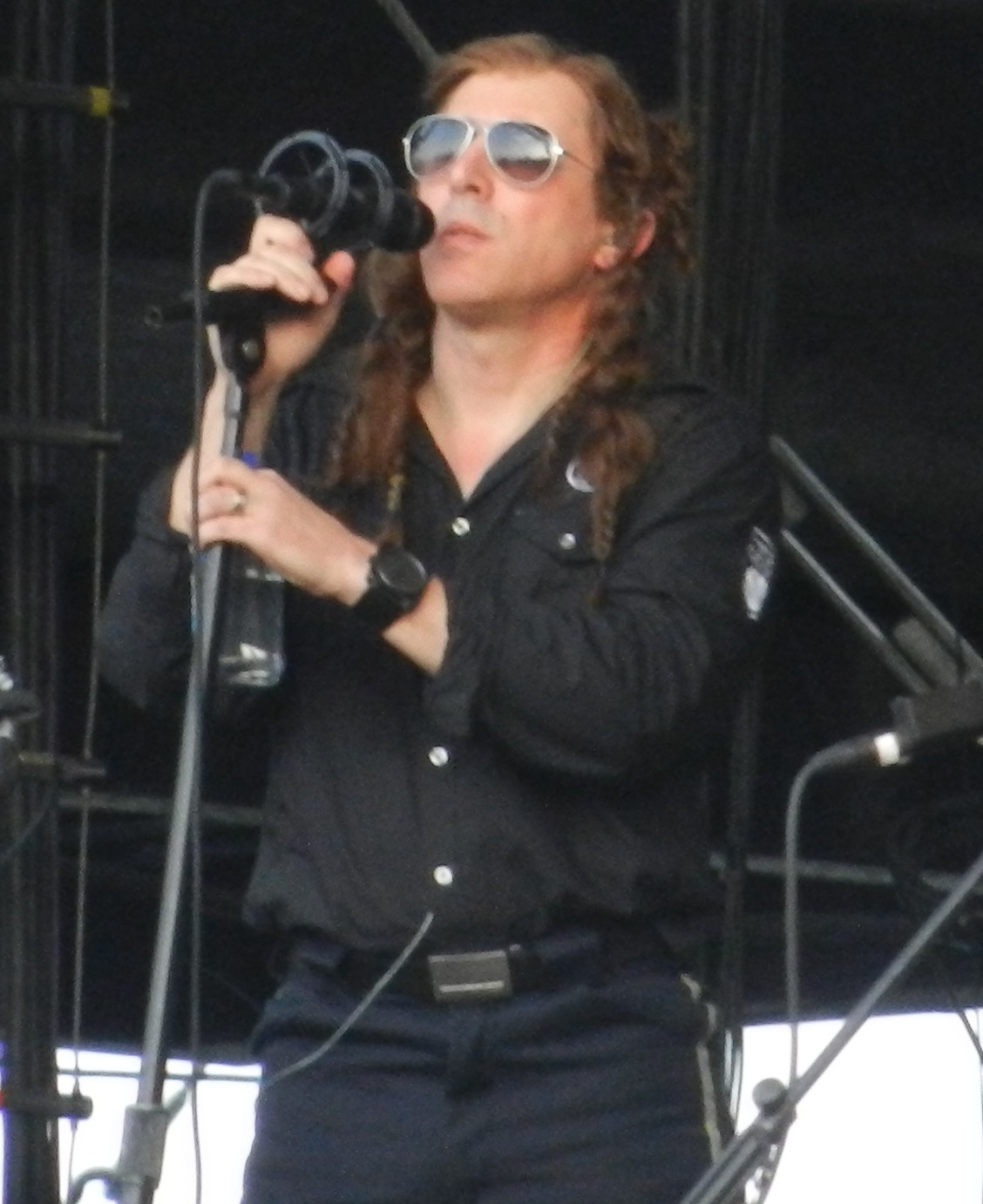
Maynard James Keenan

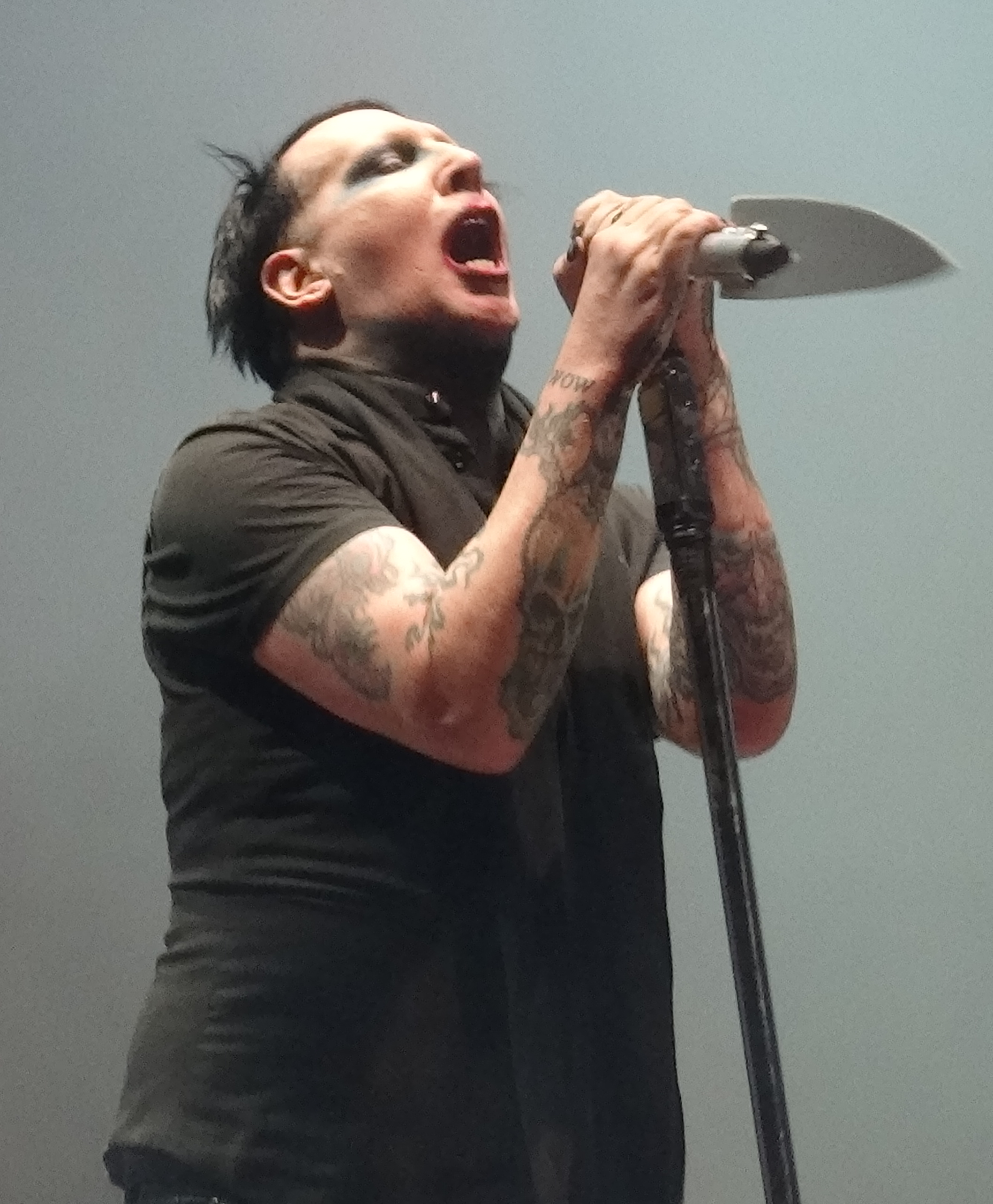
Marilyn Manson

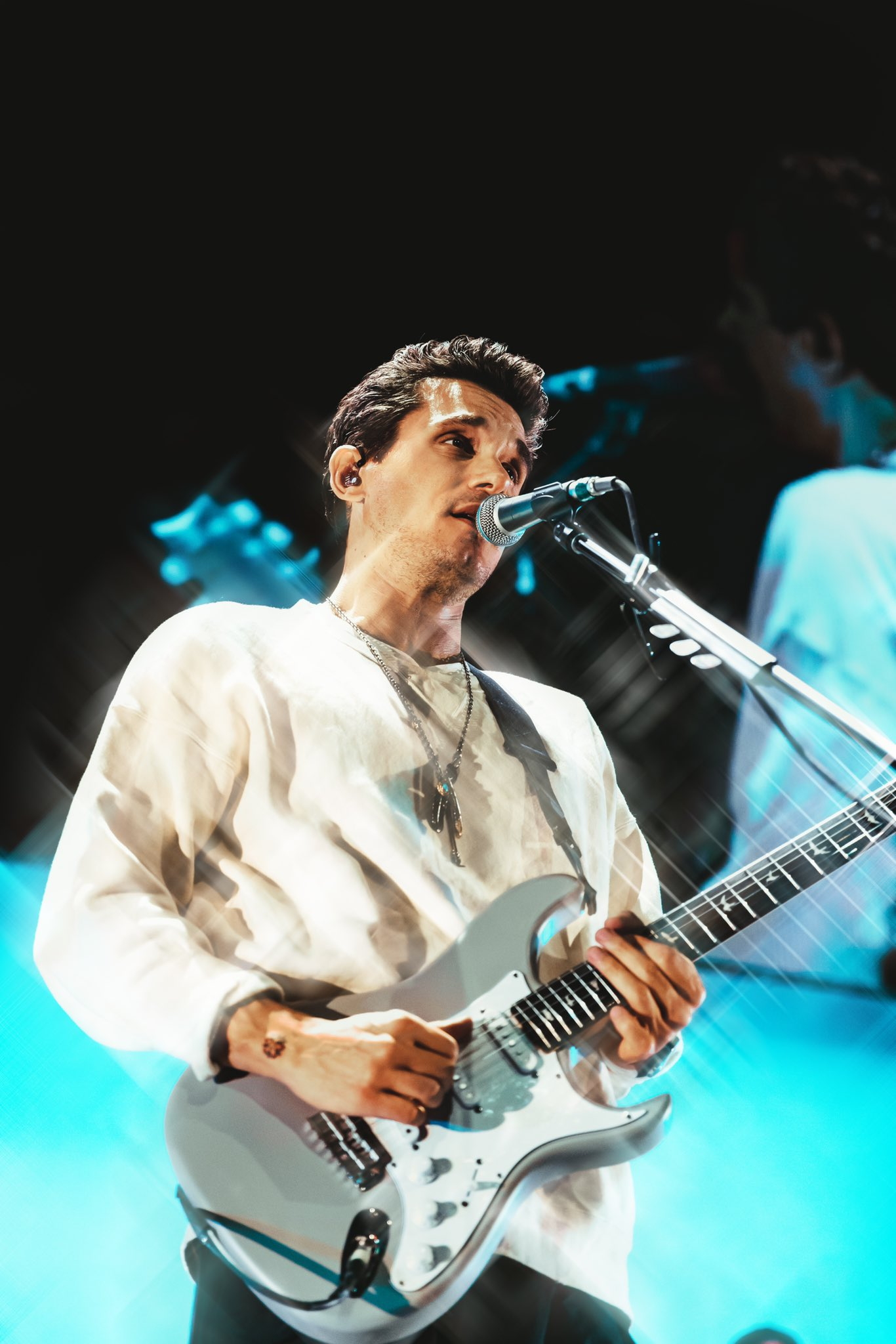
John Mayer

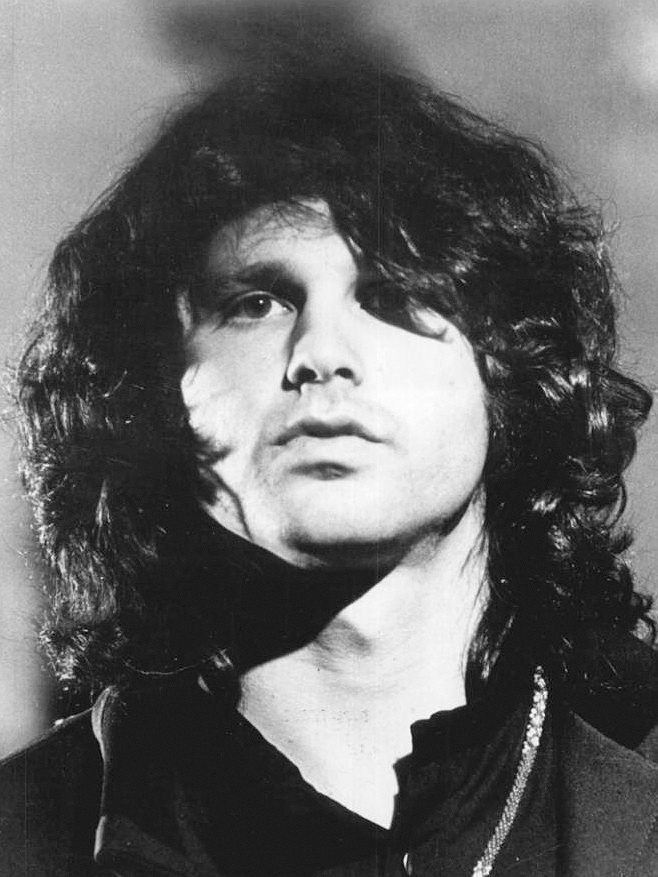
Jim Morrison

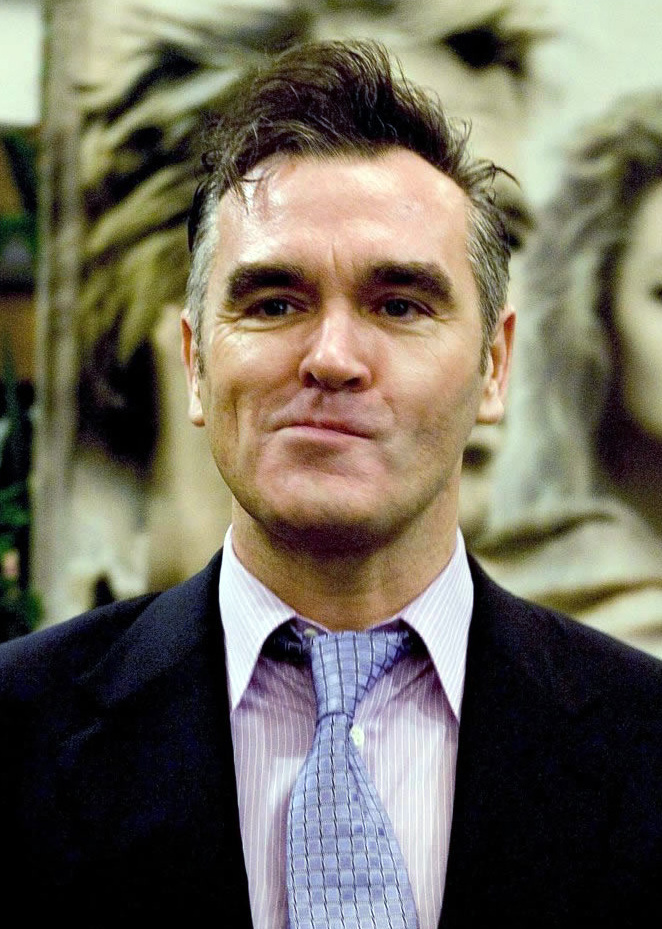
Morrissey

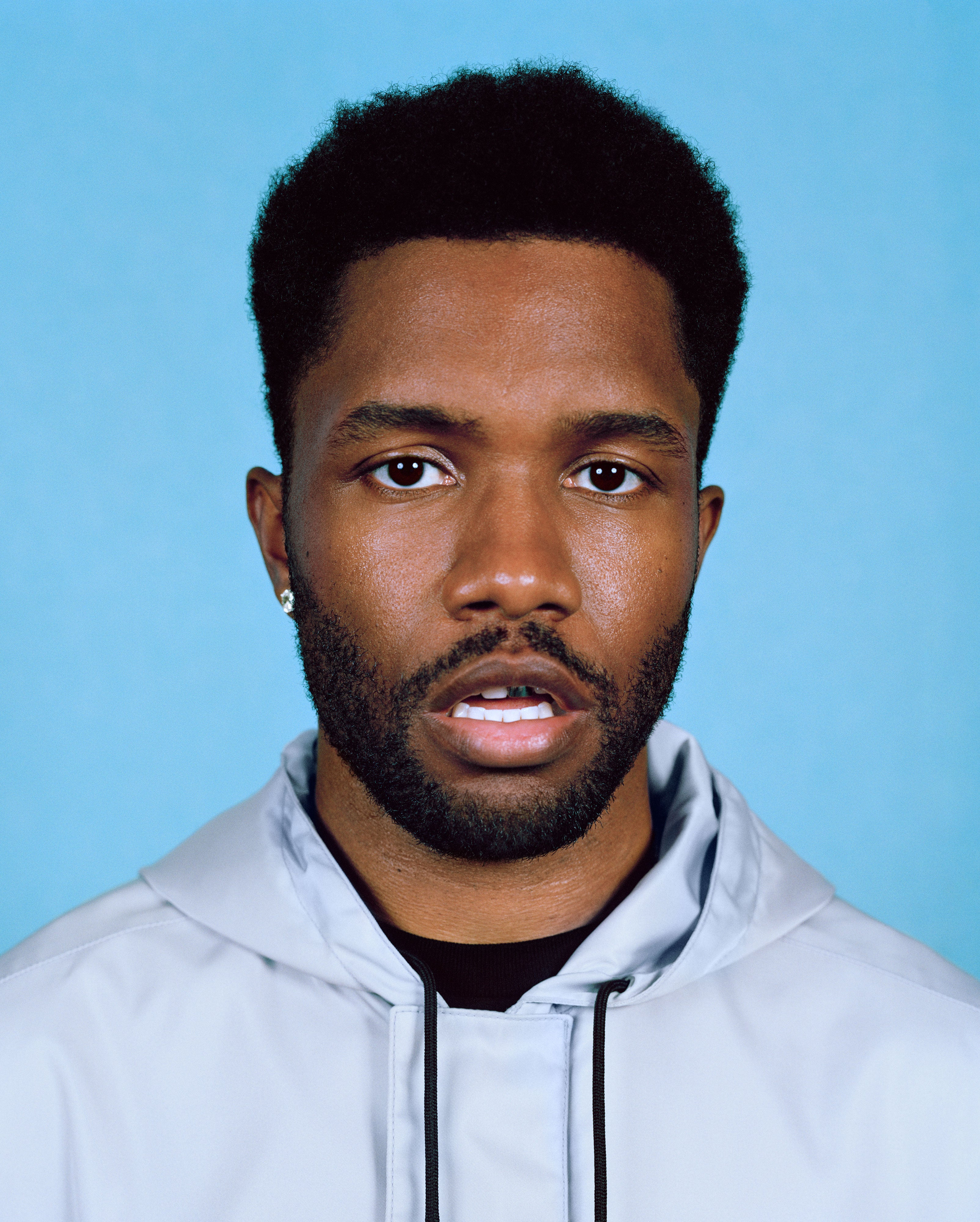
Frank Ocean

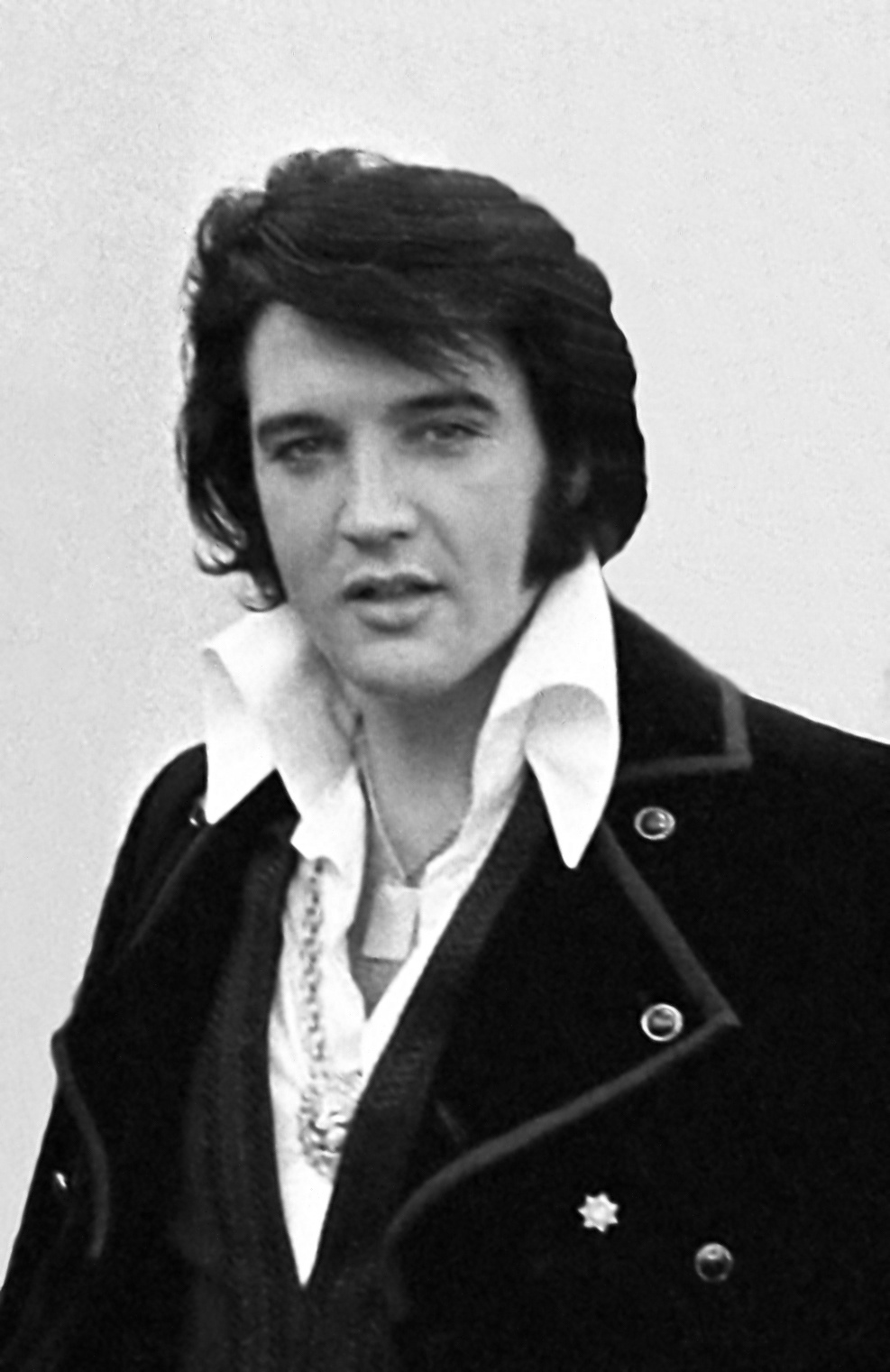
Elvis Presley

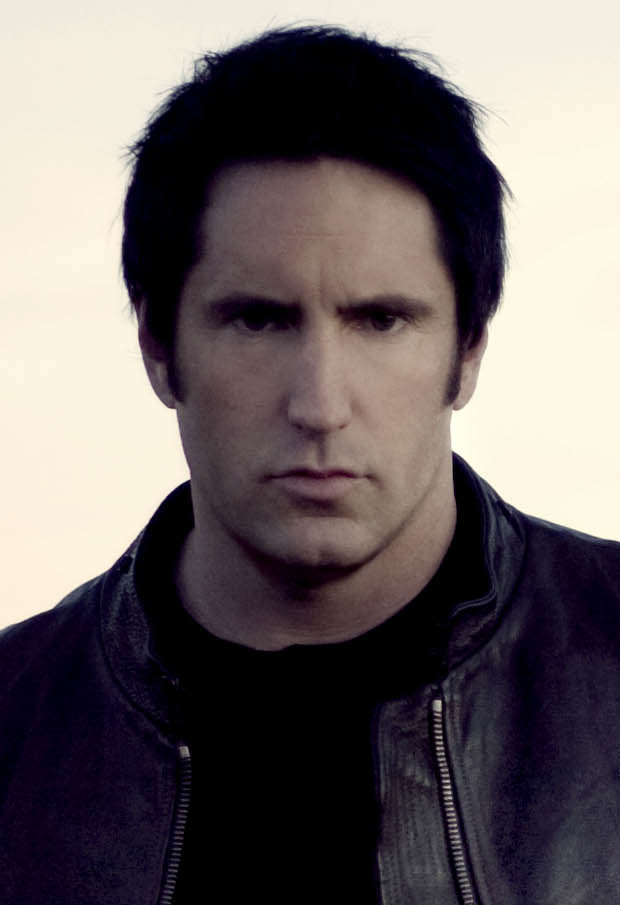
Trent Reznor

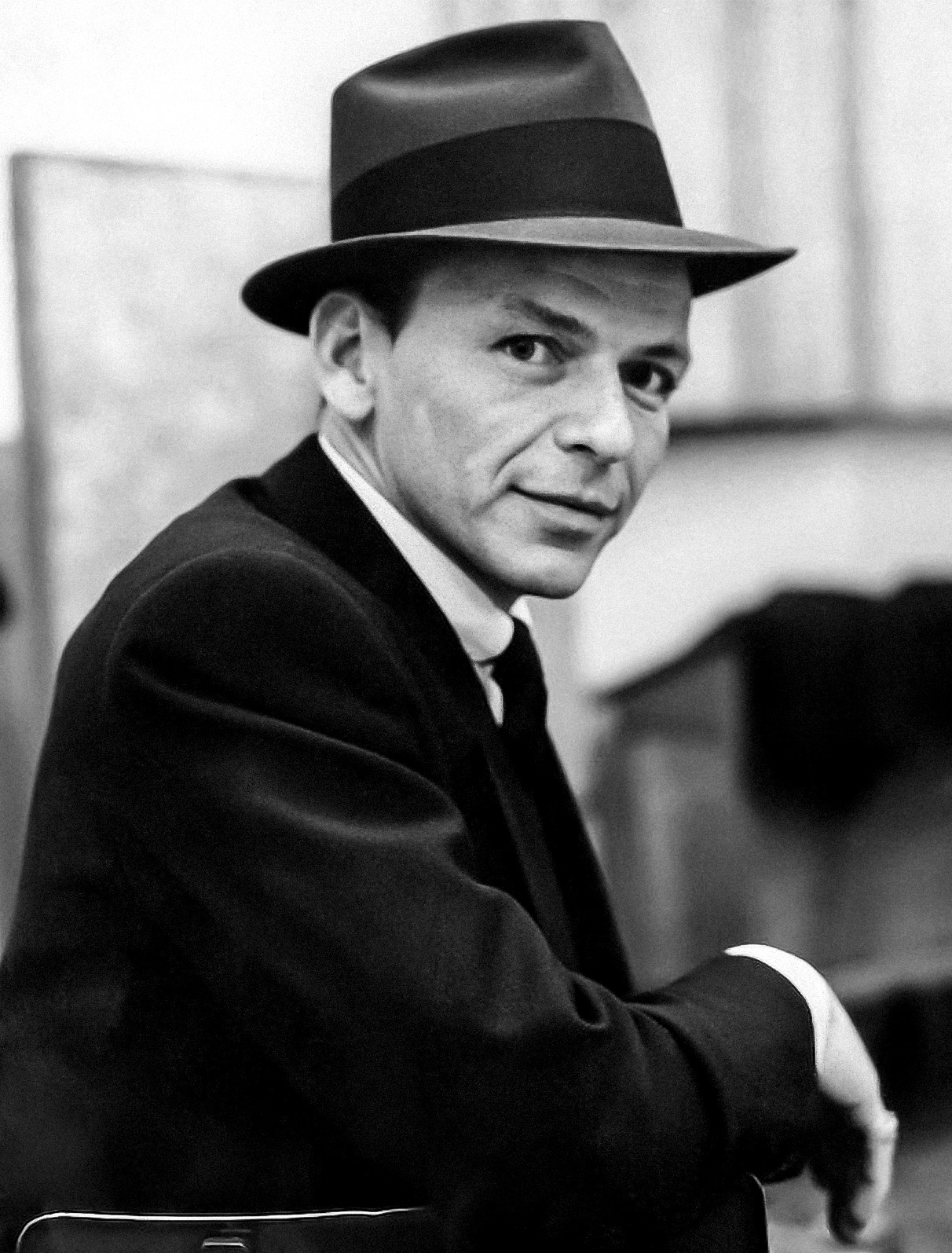
Frank Sinatra

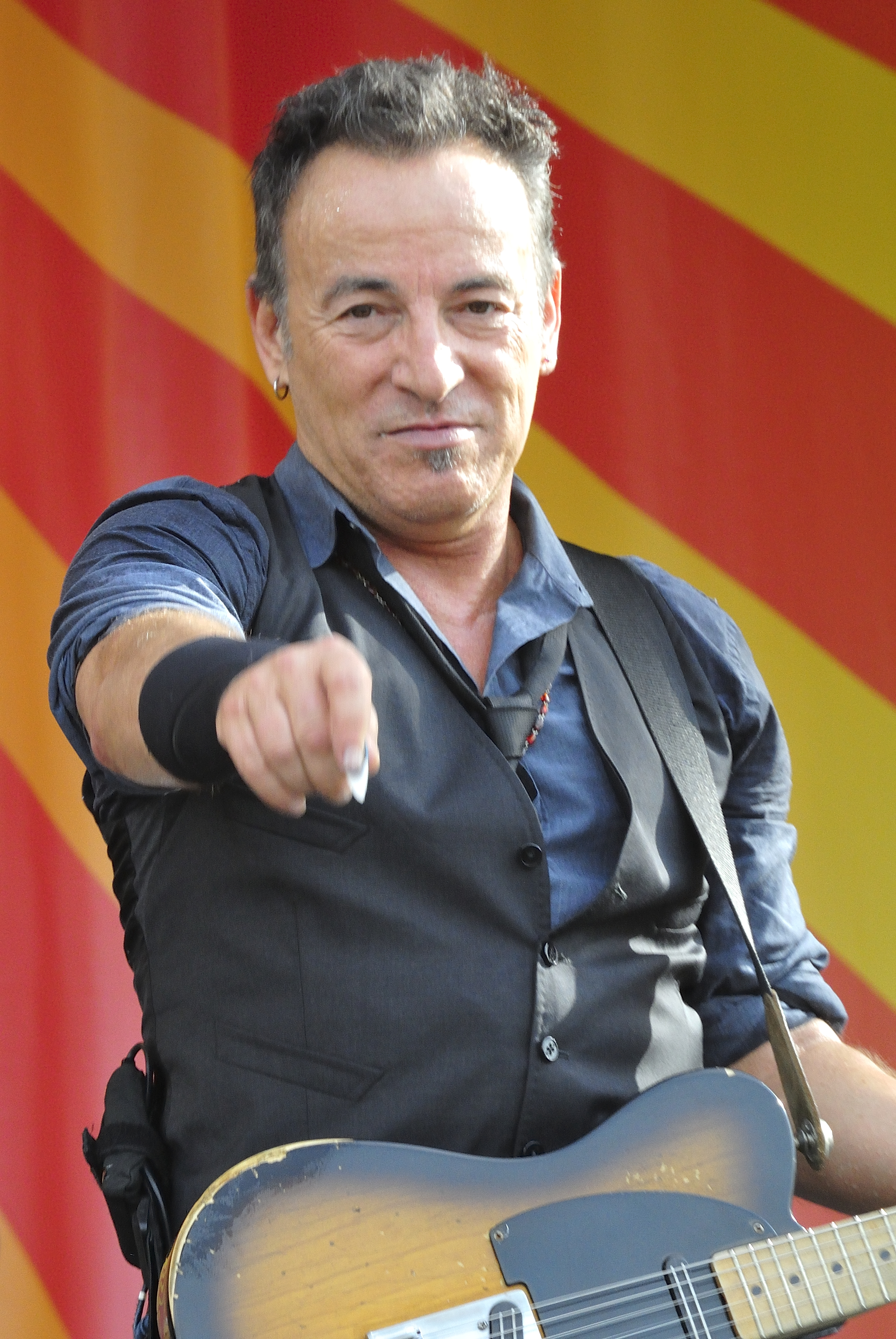
Bruce Springsteen

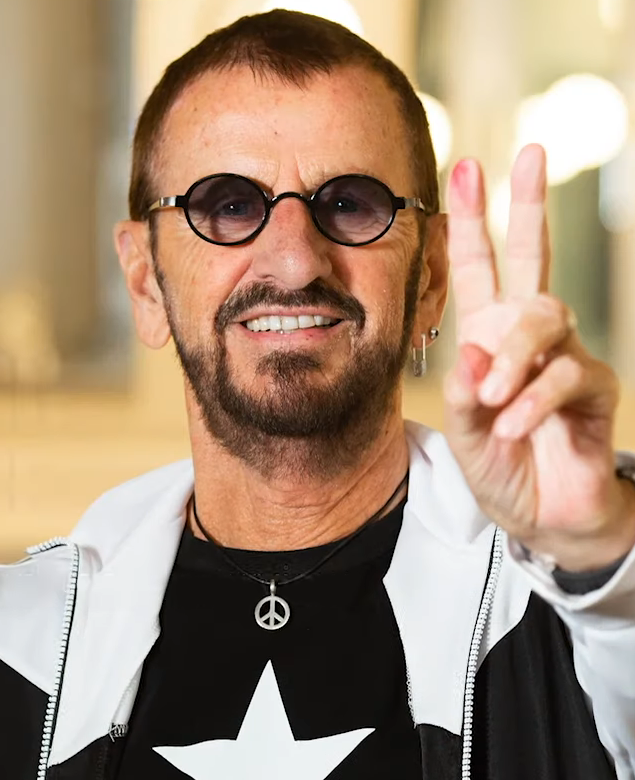
Ringo Starr

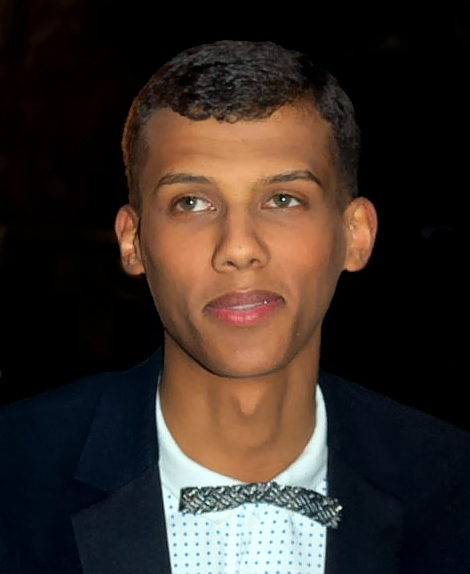
Stromae

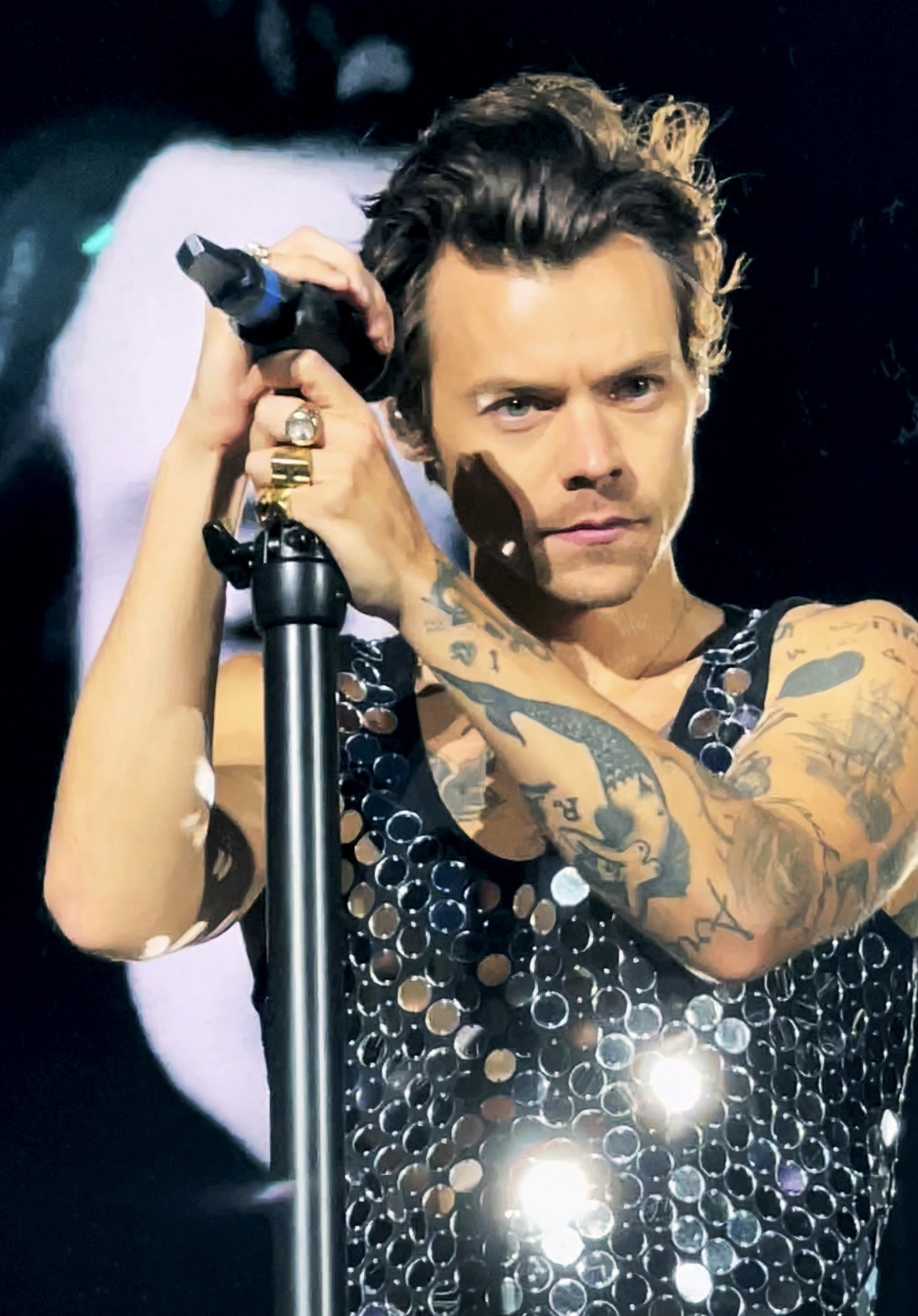
Harry Styles

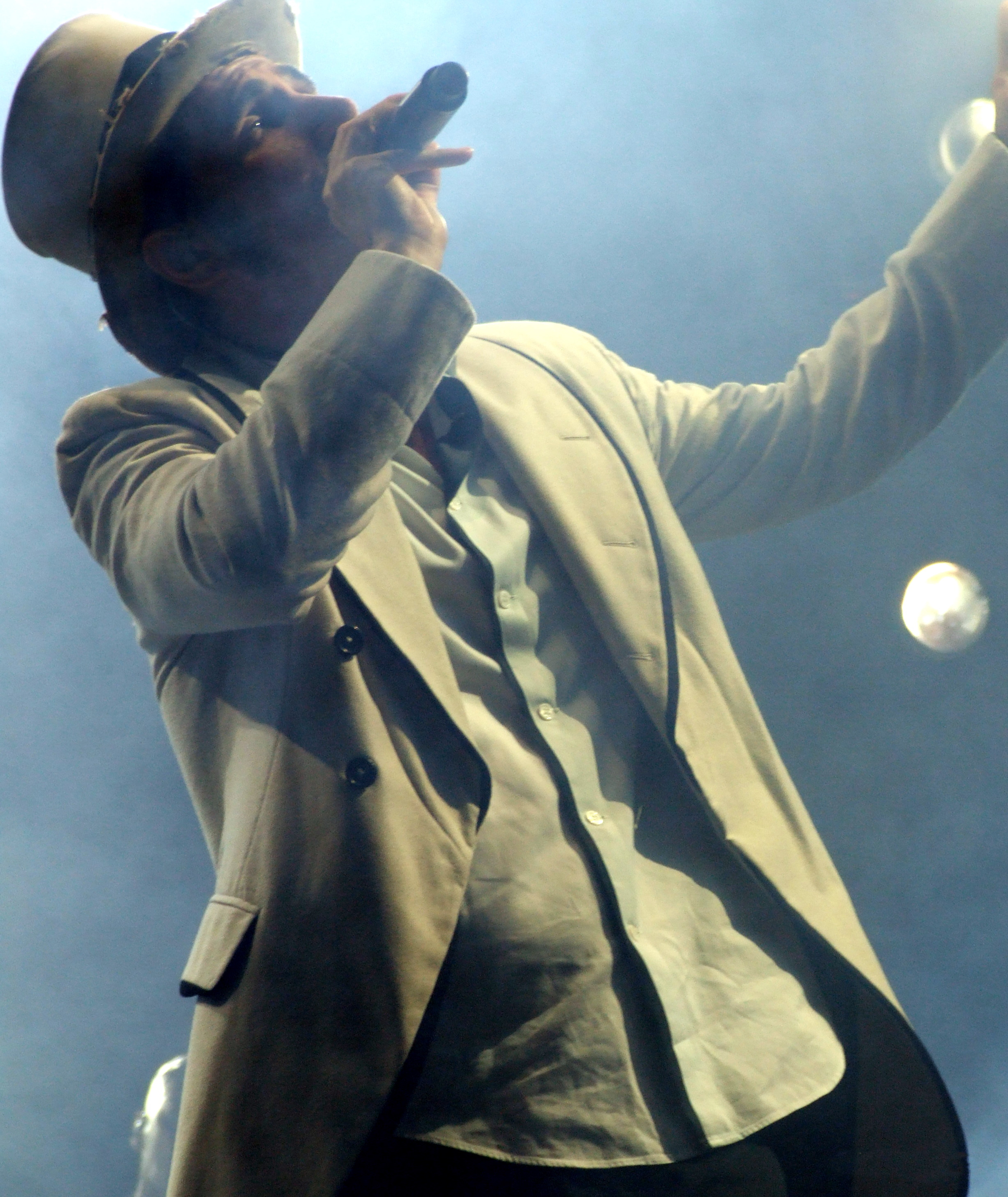
Serj Tankian

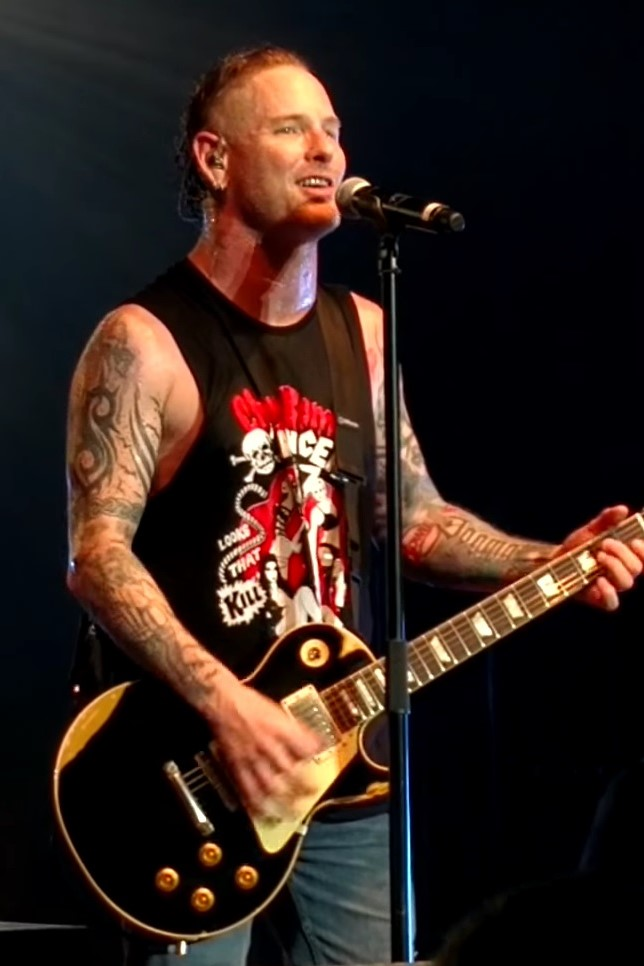
Corey Taylor

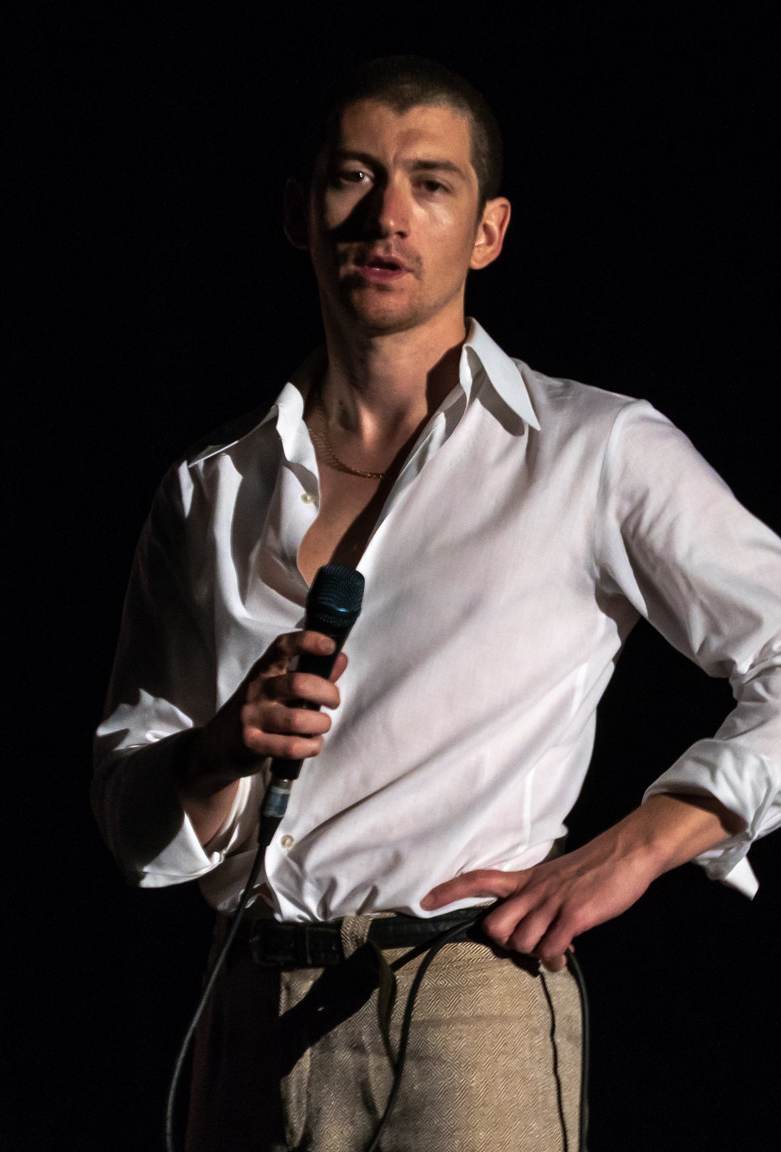
Alex Turner

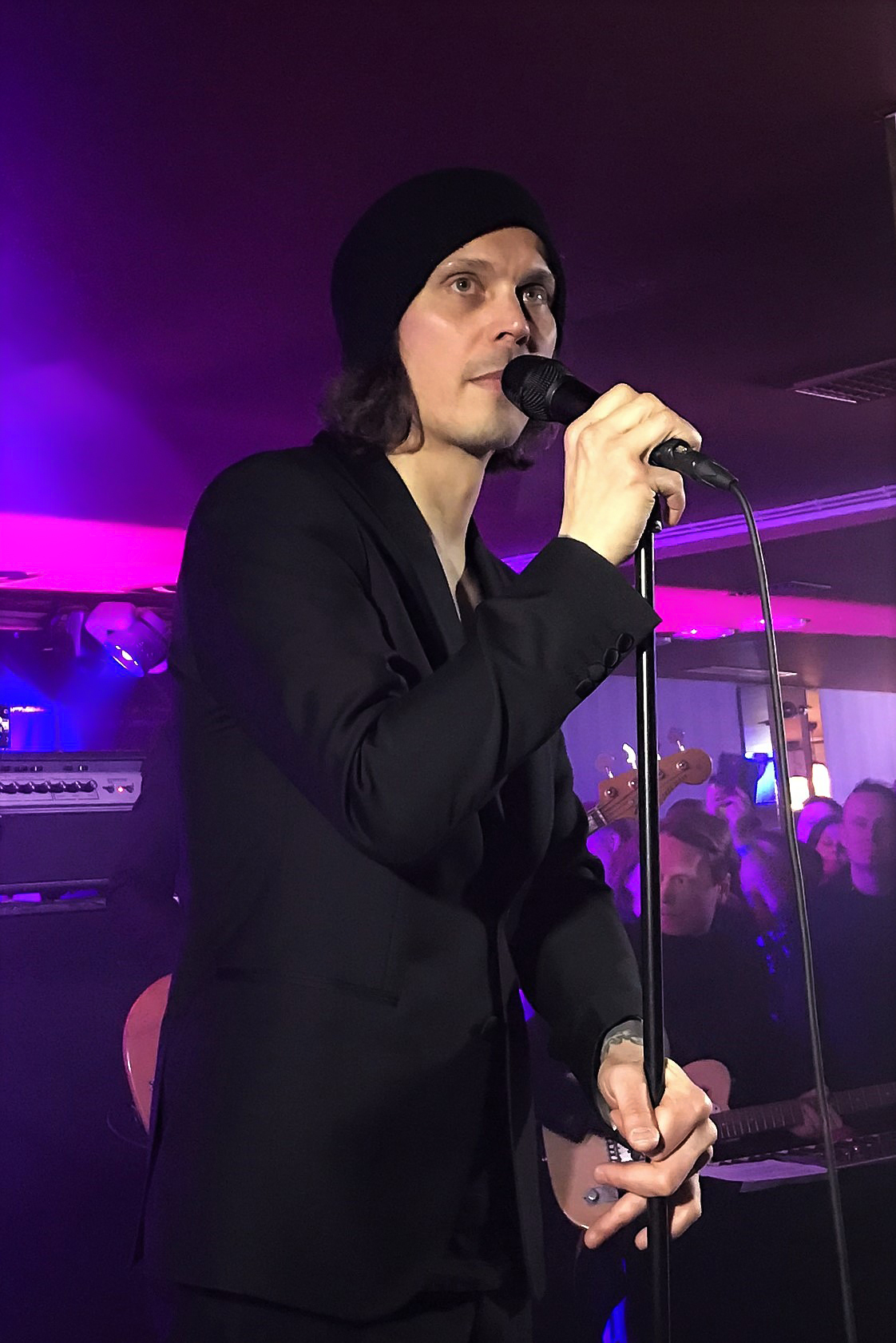
Ville Valo

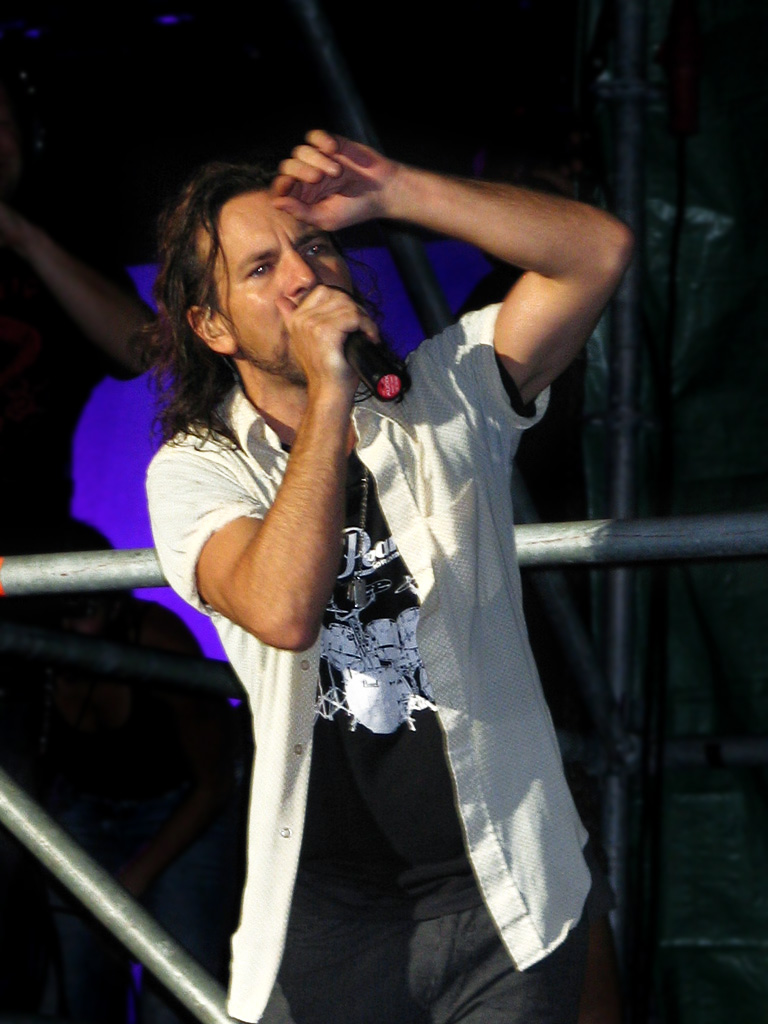
Eddie Vedder

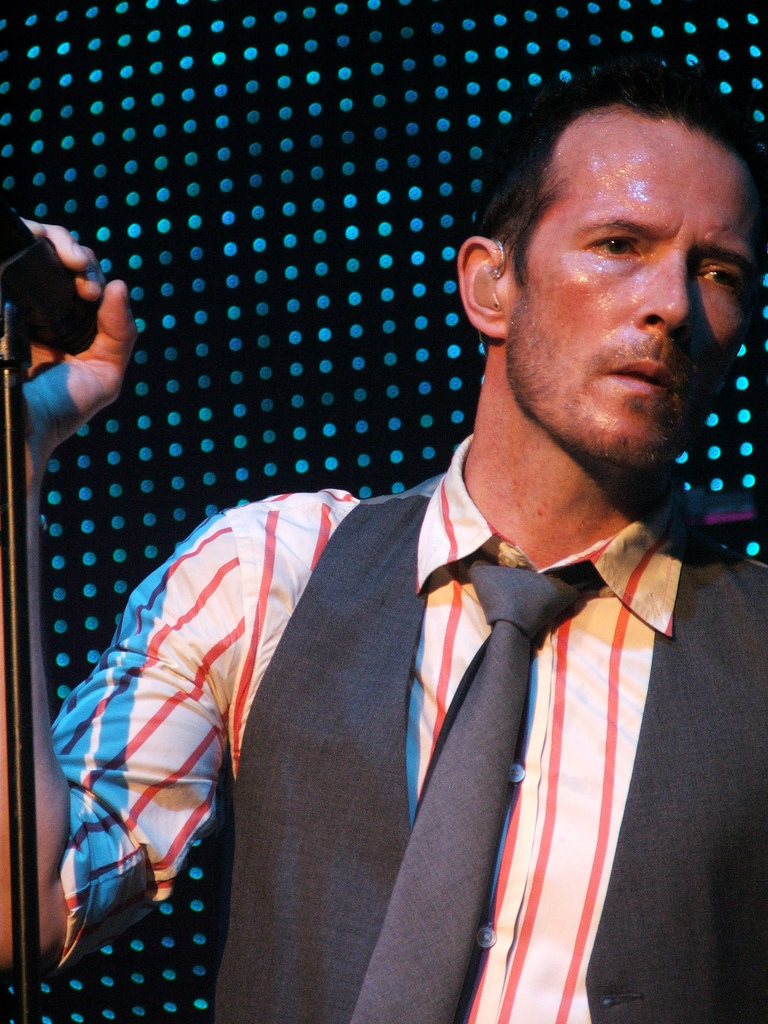
Scott Weiland

Go to: # • A • B • C • D • E • F • G • H • I • J • K • L • M • N • O • P • Q • R • S • T • U • V • W • X • Y • Z

Name	Lifespan	Nationality	Associated group(s)	Ref.
21 Savage	1992–	British		
Abra Cadabra	1997–	British	OFB	
Tunde Adebimpe	1975–	American	TV on the Radio	
Trace Adkins	1962–	American		
Mikael Åkerfeldt	1974–	Swedish	Opeth; Storm Corrosion	
Damon Albarn	1968–	British	Blur; Gorillaz	
Dave Alvin (Note: Alvin is also referred to as a bass-baritone)	1955–	American	The Flesh Eaters; X; The Knitters; The Blasters	
Tony Ahn	1978–	South Korean	H.O.T.	
Ian Anderson	1947–	British	Jethro Tull	
John Anderson	1954–2026	American		
Phil Anselmo	1968–	American	Pantera; Down	
Charlie Applewhite	1932–2001	American		
Alexander Armstrong	1970–	British		
Louis Armstrong	1901–1971	American		
Brad Arnold	1978–2026	American	3 Doors Down	
Richard Ashcroft	1971–	English	The Verve	
Ian Astbury	1962–	English	The Cult	
Rick Astley	1966–	British		
Kevin Ayers	1944–2013	British	Soft Machine	
Amitabh Bachchan	1942–	Indian		
Bad Bunny	1994–	Puerto Rican		
Faris Badwan	1986–	British	The Horrors	
Michael Ball	1962–	English		
Devendra Banhart	1981–	American		
Paul Banks	1978–	British-American	Interpol	
Matt Barlow	1971–	American	Ashes of Ares; Iced Earth; Pyramaze	
James Bay	1990–	British		
David Bazan	1976–	American	Pedro the Lion; Headphones; Overseas; The Undertow Orchestra; Lo Tom	
Willis Earl Beal	1983 or 1984–	American		
Christopher Bear	1982–	American	Grizzly Bear; Dirty Projectors	
Beck	1970–	American		
Harry Belafonte	1927–2023	American		
Burton C. Bell	1969–	American	Fear Factory; Ascension of the Watchers; City of Fire	
Brook Benton	1931–1988	American		
David Berman	1967–2019	American	Silver Jews; Purple Mountains	
Matt Berninger	1971–	American	The National	
Andy Bey	1939–2025	American		
Jello Biafra	1958–	American	Dead Kennedys; Jello Biafra and the Guantanamo School of Medicine; Lard; No WTO Combo; The Witch Trials	
Andy Biersack	1990–	American	Black Veil Brides	
Aloe Blacc	1979–	American	Emanon	
James Blake	1988–	English		
Pat Boone	1934–	American		
David Bowie	1947–2016	English	The Riot Squad; Tin Machine; Hype	
Malan Breton	1973–	Taiwanese		
Joakim Brodén	1980–	Swedish-Czech	Sabaton	
David Bromberg	1945–	American		
Junior Brown	1952–	American		
Kane Brown	1993–	American		
Luke Bryan	1976–	American		
Zach Bryan	1996-	American		
Michael Bublé	1975–	Canadian		
Eric Burdon	1941–	British	The Animals	
Burna Boy	1991–	Nigerian		
Pete Burns	1959–2016	British	Dead or Alive	
Richard Butler	1956–	English	The Psychedelic Furs; Love Spit Love	
Daniel Caesar	1995–	Canadian		
John Cale	1942–	Welsh	The Velvet Underground	
Bill Callahan	1966–	American	Smog	
Jeremy Camp	1978–	American		
Lewis Capaldi	1996–	Scottish		
Julian Casablancas	1978–	American	The Strokes	
Johnny Cash (Note: Cash is also referred to as a bass-baritone and a bass)	1932–2003	American	The Highwaymen; The Tennessee Three	
Josh Caterer (Note: Some sources also refer to Caterer as a tenor)	1972–	American	Smoking Popes	
Miles Caton	2005–	American		
Paul Cauthen	1985/1986–	American		
Nick Cave	1957–	Australian	Nick Cave and the Bad Seeds	
Chanyeol	1992–	South Korean	Exo	
Grian Chatten	1995-	Irish	Fontaines D.C.	
Kenny Chesney	1968–	American		
Jacky Cheung	1961–	Chinese		
Andy Childs	1962–	American	Sixwire	
Eric Clapton	1945–	British	The Yardbirds; Cream; Derek and the Dominos	
Lewis Cleale		American		
Kurt Cobain	1967–1994	American	Nirvana	
Jarvis Cocker	1963–	British	Pulp	
Joe Cocker	1944–2014	English	The Grease Band	
David Allan Coe	1939–	American		
Leonard Cohen (Note: Some sources also refer to Cohen as both a bass-baritone and a bass)	1934–2016	Canadian		
J. Cole	1985–	American		
Lloyd Cole	1961–	English	Lloyd Cole and the Commotions	
Nat King Cole	1919–1965	American		
Jacob Collier	1994–	English		
Chris Collingwood	1967–	American	Fountains of Wayne	
Arthur Collins	1864–1933	American	Collins & Harlan; Peerless Quartet	
Luke Combs	1990–	American		
Perry Como	1912/1913–2001	American		
Harry Connick Jr.	1967–	American		
Alice Cooper	1948–	American	Alice Cooper	
Bradley Cooper	1975–	American		
Easton Corbin	1982–	American		
Nick Cordero	1978–2020	Canadian		
Chris Cornell	1964–2017	American	Soundgarden; Audioslave; Temple of the Dog	
Hugh Cornwell	1949–	British	The Stranglers	
David Coverdale	1951–	English	Whitesnake; Deep Purple	
Bing Crosby	1903–1977 or 1904–1977	American		
Kid Cudi	1984–	American	WZRD; Kids See Ghosts	
Jamie Cullum	1979–	English		
Tim Curry	1946–2026	British		
Ian Curtis	1956–1980	British	Joy Division	
Vic Damone	1928–2018	American		
Glenn Danzig	1955–	American	Misfits; Samhain; Danzig	
Adam "Nergal" Darski	1977–	Polish	Me and That Man; Behemoth	
Brian d'Arcy James	1968–	American		
Mac DeMarco	1990–	Canadian		
Tommy DeVito	1928–2020	American	The Four Seasons	
Joe Diffie	1958–2020	American		
Neil Diamond	1941–	American		
Orlando Dixon	1988 or 1989–	American	DCappella	
Nate Dogg	1969–2011	American	213	
Fats Domino	1928–2017	American		
Donghae	1986–	South Korean	Super Junior; Super Junior-M; Super Junior-D&E	
Will Downing	1963–	American		
David Draiman	1973–	American	Disturbed; Device	
Drake	1986–	Canadian		
Nick Drake	1948–1974	English		
Bob Dylan	1941–	American	Traveling Wilburys	
Dave East	1988–	American		
Billy Eckstine (Note: Eckstine is also referred to as a bass-baritone)	1914–1993	American		
Eden	1995–	Irish		
Zac Efron	1987–	American		
Brett Eldredge	1986–	American		
Andrew Eldritch	1959–	British	The Sisters of Mercy; The Sisterhood	
Danny Elfman	1953–	American	Oingo Boingo; Boingo	
Ansel Elgort	1994–	American		
Kurt Elling	1967–	American		
Don Everly	1937–2021	American	The Everly Brothers	
George Ezra	1993–	English		
Henry Fambrough	1938–2024	American	The Spinners	
Joey Fatone	1977–	American	NSYNC	
Michael Feinstein	1956–	American		
Felix	2000–	Korean-Australian	Stray Kids	
Alejandro Fernández	1971–	Mexican		
Bryan Ferry	1945–	English	Roxy Music; The Bryan Ferry Orchestra	
Charlie Fink (Note: Fink is also referred to as a tenor)	1986–	English	Noah and the Whale	
Robb Flynn	1968–	American	Vio-lence; Machine Head	
John Fogerty (Note: Fogerty is also referred to as a tenor)	1945–	American	Creedence Clearwater Revival	
Jeffrey Foucault	1976–	American	Redbird	
Bobby Fox		Irish-Australian		
Michael Franks	1944-	American		
Hadley Fraser	1980-	British		
Donnie Fritts	1942–2019	American		
Chris Gaffney	1950–2008	American	Hacienda Brothers	
Dave Gahan	1962–	British	Depeche Mode	
Serge Gainsbourg	1928–1991	French		
Liam Gallagher	1972–	British	Oasis; Beady Eye	
Larry Gatlin	1948–	American	The Gatlin Brothers	
Mike Geier	1964–	American		
Billy Gibbons	1949–	American	ZZ Top	
Daughn Gibson	1981–	American	Pearls and Brass	
Tyrese Gibson	1978–	American		
Johnny Gill	1966–	American	New Edition	
David Gilmour	1946–	English	Pink Floyd	
Michael Gira (Note: Gira has also been referred to as a bass-baritone)	1954–	American	Swans	
Giveon	1995–	American		
Marian Gold	1954–	German	Alphaville	
William Lee Golden	1939–	American	The Oak Ridge Boys	
Al Goodman (Note: Goodman is also referred to as a baritone-bass)	1943–2010	American	Ray, Goodman & Brown	
Vern Gosdin	1934–2009	American		
Ryan Gosling	1980–	Canadian	Dead Man's Bones	
Will Gould	1988–	English	Creeper	
Robert Goulet	1933–2007	American		
Greg Graffin	1964–	American	Bad Religion	
Larry Graham	1946–	American	Sly and the Family Stone	
Josh Groban	1981–	American		
H.R.	1956–	British-American	Bad Brains	
Merle Haggard	1937–2016	American		
Cedric "K-Ci" Hailey	1969–	American	K-Ci & JoJo; Jodeci	
Beres Hammond	1955–	Jamaican		
Glen Hansard	1970–2026	Irish	The Frames; The Swell Season	
Calvin Harris	1984–	Scottish		
Johnny Hartman	1923–1983	American		
Steve Harwell	1967–2023	American	Smash Mouth	
Isaac Hayes (Note: Hayes is also referred to as a bass-baritone)	1942–2008	American		
Dick Haymes	1916–1980	Argentine-American		
Justin Hayward	1946–	English	The Moody Blues	
Matt Heafy	1986-	American	Trivium	
Johan Hegg	1973–	Swedish	Amon Amarth	
Heino	1938–	German		
Jimi Hendrix	1942–1970	American	The Jimi Hendrix Experience; Curtis Knight and the Squires; Jimmy James and the Blue Flames	
Joshua Henry	1984-	Canadian		
James Hetfield	1963–	American	Metallica	
John Hiatt (Note: Some sources also refer to Hiatt as a tenor)	1952–	American		
Tom Hiddleston	1981–	English		
Josh Homme	1973–	American	Queens of the Stone Age; Them Crooked Vultures; Eagles of Death Metal	
Peter Hook	1956–	English	New Order; Joy Division	
Mark Hoppus	1972–	American	blink-182; +44; Simple Creatures	
Scott Hoying	1991–	American	Pentatonix; Superfruit	
Hozier	1990–	Irish		
Michael Hutchence	1960–1997	Australian	INXS; Max Q	
Caleb Lee Hutchinson	1999–	American		
Hwanhee	1982–	South Korean	Fly to the Sky	
Hyungwon	1994–	South Korean	Monsta X; Shownu X Hyungwon	
Billy Idol	1955–	British	Generation X; Chelsea	
James Monroe Iglehart	1974–	American		
iLoveMakonnen (Note: Some sources also refer to iLoveMakonnen as a tenor)	1989–	American		
James Ingram	1952–2019	American		
Gregory Isaacs	1951–2010	Jamaican		
Hugh Jackman	1968–	Australian		
Alan Jackson	1958–	American		
Christopher Jackson	1975–	American		
Mick Jagger	1943–	English	The Rolling Stones	
José James	1978–	American		
Rick James	1948–2004	American	The Mynah Birds	
Waylon Jennings	1937–2002	American		
David Johansen	1950–2025	American	New York Dolls	
Brian Johnson	1947–	English	AC/DC; Geordie	
Calvin Johnson	1962–	American	Beat Happening; The Halo Benders	
Jamey Johnson	1975–	American		
Jay Armstrong Johnson	1987–	American		
Joji	1992–	Japanese-Australian		
Tom Jones (Note: Some sources also refer to Jones as a tenor)	1940–	Welsh		
Jung Joon-young	1989–	South Korean	Drug Restaurant	
Jyrki 69	1968–	Finnish	The 69 Eyes	
Paul Kantner	1941–2016	American	Jefferson Airplane; Jefferson Starship	
Alex Kapranos	1972–	Scottish	Franz Ferdinand; FFS; BNQT	
Ramin Karimloo	1978–	Iranian-Canadian		
Andy Karl	1973–	American		
Howard Keel	1919–2004	American		
Maynard James Keenan	1964–	American	Tool; A Perfect Circle; Puscifer	
Toby Keith	1961–2024	American		
Eugene Kelly	1965–	Scottish	The Vaselines	
Scott Kelly	1967–	American	Neurosis; Tribes of Neurot	
Hal Ketchum	1953–2020	American		
Khalid	1998–	American		
Anthony Kiedis	1962–	American	Red Hot Chili Peppers	
Steve Kilbey	1954–	Australian	The Church	
Val Kilmer	1959–2025 or 1960–2025	American		
Takuya Kimura	1972–	Japanese	SMAP	
Ben E. King	1938–2015	American	The Drifters	
Mike Kinsella	1977–	American	American Football; Cap'n Jazz; Joan of Arc; Owen; Owls; Their / They're / There	
Mark Knopfler	1949–	British	Dire Straits	
Mark Kozelek	1967–	American	Red House Painters; Sun Kil Moon	
Uncle Kracker	1974–	American		
Rocky Kramer	1990–	Norwegian-American	The Rocky Kramer Band	
Chad Kroeger	1973–	Canadian	Nickelback	
Kwabs	1990–	English		
Steve Lacy (Note: Lacy is also referred to as a tenor and a bass)	1998–	American	The Internet	
Drew Lachey	1976–	American	98 Degrees	
Mark Lanegan	1964–2022	American	Screaming Trees	
Jerry Lawson (Note: Some sources also refer to Lawson as a tenor)	1944–2019	American	The Persuasions	
Christopher Lee	1922–2015	English		
John Legend	1978–	American		
Jens Lekman (Note: Lekman is also referred to as a tenor)	1981–	Swedish		
Aaron Lewis	1972–	American	Staind	
Huey Lewis	1950-	American	Huey Lewis & The News	
Norm Lewis	1963–	American		
Gary Lightbody	1976–	Irish	Snow Patrol; The Reindeer Section	
Gordon Lightfoot	1938–2023	Canadian		
Lil Nas X (Note: Lil Nas X is also referred to as a tenor)	1999–	American		
Mike Love	1941–	American	The Beach Boys	
Mark Lowry	1958–	American	Gaither Vocal Band	
John Lydon	1956–	English	Sex Pistols; Public Image Ltd	
Phil Lynott	1949–1986	English-Irish	Thin Lizzy	
M.anifest	1982–	Ghanaian		
Seth MacFarlane	1973–	American		
Gordon MacRae	1921–1986	American		
Kevin Mahogany	1958–2017	American		
Post Malone	1995–	American		
Anders Manga (Note: Manga is also referred to as a bass)	1973–	American	Bloody Hammers	
Dan Mangan	1983–	Canadian		
Barry Manilow	1943–	American		
Philip Margo	1942–2021	American	The Tokens	
Carlos Marín	1968–2021	German-Spanish	Il Divo	
Archy Marshall	1994–	English	King Krule	
Chris Martin (Note: Some sources also refer to Chris Martin as a tenor)	1977–	English	Coldplay	
Dean Martin	1917–1995	American	Rat Pack	
Tony Martin	1913–2012	American		
Hugh Masekela	1939–2018	South African		
Dave Matthews	1967–	American	Dave Matthews Band	
John Maus	1980–	American		
John Mayer	1977–	American	John Mayer Trio; Dead & Company	
Scotty McCreery	1993–	American		
Michael McDonald	1952–	American	Steely Dan; The Doobie Brothers	
Rick McFarland	1970–	American	BYU Vocal Point	
AJ McLean	1978–	American	Backstreet Boys	
Bill Medley	1940–	American	The Righteous Brothers	
Tom Meighan	1981–	British	Kasabian	
John Cougar Mellencamp	1951–	American		
Brian Stokes Mitchell	1957–	American		
Matt Monro	1930–1985	British		
Country Dick Montana	1955–1995	American	The Beat Farmers	
John Michael Montgomery	1965-	American		
Ivan Moody	1980–	American	Five Finger Death Punch; Ghost Machine	
Tom Morello	1964–	American	Rage Against the Machine; Audioslave; Prophets of Rage; Lock Up	
Whitey Morgan	1975/1976–	American	Whitey Morgan & the 78's	
Nathan Morris	1971–	American	Boyz II Men	
Jim Morrison	1943–1971	American	The Doors	
Morrissey	1959–	British	The Smiths; The Nosebleeds	
Marcus Mumford	1987–	American-British	Mumford and Sons	
Peter Murphy	1957–	British	Bauhaus	
Jim Nabors	1930–2017	American		
Willie Nelson (Note: Some sources also refer to Nelson as a tenor)	1933–	American		
Tom Netherton	1947–2018	American		
Leonard Nimoy	1931–2015	American		
Finneas O'Connell	1997–	American		
Philip Oakey	1955–	British	The Human League	
John Oates	1948–	American	Hall & Oates	
Frank Ocean	1987–	American	Odd Future	
David Olney	1948–2020	American		
Omarion	1984–	American	B2K	
Okieriete Onaodowan	1987–	American		
Roland Orzabal	1961–	British	Tears for Fears	
Jeffrey Osborne	1948–	American	L.T.D.	
Greg Page	1972–	Australian	The Wiggles	
Ken Page	1954–2024	American		
Robert Palmer	1949–2003	British	The Power Station	
Kevin Parent	1972–	Canadian		
Park Hyo-shin (Note: Some sources also refer to Park as a tenor or baritenor.)	1981–	South Korean		
John Park	1988–	Korean-American		
Andy Partridge	1953–	English	XTC; The Dukes of Stratosphear	
Orville Peck	1988–	Canadian		
Teddy Pendergrass	1950–2010	American	Harold Melvin & the Blue Notes	
William Pennell	1889–1956	American		
Brendan Perry	1959–	British	Dead Can Dance	
Jim Peterik	1950–	American	Survivor; The Ides of March	
Mike Pinder	1941–	English	The Moody Blues	
Chris Pine	1980–	American		
Nick Pitera	1986–	American		
Iggy Pop	1947–	American	The Stooges	
Gregory Porter	1971–	American		
Elvis Presley (Note: Some sources also refer to Presley as a tenor)	1935–1977	American		
Charley Pride	1934–2020	American		
Prince (Note: Prince is also known for his wide-ranging vocal ability which includes tenor and falsetto)	1958–2016	American	The Revolution	
Simon Pryce	1972–	Australian	The Wiggles	
Arthur Prysock (Note: Prysock is also referred to as a bass-baritone)	1929–1997	American		
Greg Puciato	1980–	American	The Dillinger Escape Plan; The Black Queen; Killer Be Killed	
Gene Puerling (Note: Puerling is also referred to as a bass-baritone)	1929–2008	American	The Hi-Lo's; The Singers Unlimited	
Philip Quast	1957–	Australian		
Rag'n'Bone Man	1985–	English		
Shiva Rajkumar	1962–	Indian		
David Ramirez	1983–	American		
Lou Rawls	1933–2006	American		
Leon Redbone	1949–2019	Canadian-Cypriot		
Lou Reed	1942–2013	American	The Velvet Underground	
Jim Reeves	1923–1964	American		
Dan Reynolds	1987–	American	Imagine Dragons	
Trent Reznor	1965–	American	Nine Inch Nails; Option 30; The Innocent; Exotic Birds; How to Destroy Angels	
Thomas Rhett	1990–	American		
RM (Note: RM is also referred to as a bass)	1994–	South Korean	BTS	
Marty Robbins	1925–1982	American		
Brad Roberts (Note: Some sources also refer to Roberts as a bass-baritone and a bass)	1964–	Canadian	Crash Test Dummies	
Kenny Rogers	1938–2020	American		
Will Roland	1989–	American		
Dexter Romweber	1966–2024	American	Flat Duo Jets; Let's Active; Dex Romweber Duo	
Axl Rose	1962–	American	Guns N' Roses; Hollywood Rose	
Gavin Rossdale	1965–	English	Bush; Institute	
David Lee Roth	1954–	American	Van Halen; The David Lee Roth Band	
Sean Rowe	1975–	American		
Darius Rucker	1966–	American	Hootie & the Blowfish	
David Ruffin	1941–1991	American	The Temptations	
RuPaul	1960–	American	RuPaul's Drag Race	
Thomas Sanders	1989–	American		
Mark Sandman	1951–1999 or 1952–1999	American	Morphine; Treat Her Right	
Andy Samberg	1978–	American	The Lonely Island	
Wes Scantlin	1972–	American	Puddle of Mudd	
Gil Scott-Heron	1949–2011	American		
Bob Seger (Note: Some sources also refer to Seger as a tenor)	1945–	American		
Brian Setzer	1959–	American	The Tomcats; Stray Cats; The Brian Setzer Orchestra	
Shaboozey	1995–	Nigerian-American		
M. Shadows	1981–	American	Avenged Sevenfold	
Shaggy	1968–	Jamaican		
George Beverly Shea (Note: Some sources also refer to Shea as a bass-baritone)	1909–2013	Canadian-American		
Blake Shelton	1976–	American		
Mike Shinoda	1977–	American	Linkin Park; Fort Minor	
Jackie Shroff	1957–	Indian		
Frank Sinatra (Note: Sinatra is also referred to as a tenor)	1915–1998	American	Rat Pack	
Arijit Singh	1987–	Indian		
Troye Sivan	1995–	Australian		
Matt Skiba (Note: Skiba is also referred to as a tenor)	1976–	American	Alkaline Trio; Blink-182; Matt Skiba and the Sekrets; Heavens; TheHell	
Dan Smith	1986–	British	Bastille	
Tom Smith	1981–	British	Editors	
Chris Smither	1944–	American		
Wilbur Soot	1996–	British	Lovejoy	
Bruce Springsteen (Note: Some sources also refer to Springsteen as a tenor)	1949–	American	E Street Band	
Aaron Stainthorpe	1968–	English	My Dying Bride	
Mikael Stanne	1974–	Swedish	Dark Tranquillity	
Stuart A. Staples	1965–	English	Tindersticks	
Chris Stapleton	1978–	American	The SteelDrivers; The Jompson Brothers	
Scott Stapp	1973–	American	Creed; Art of Anarchy	
Ringo Starr	1940–	British	The Beatles; All-Starr Band	
Cat Stevens	1948–	British		
Michael Stipe	1960–	American	R.E.M.	
Doug Stone	1956–	American		
Stromae	1985–	Belgian		
Sly Stone	1943–	American	Sly and the Family Stone	
Joe Strummer	1952–2002	British	The Clash; The 101ers; The Mescaleros; The Pogues	
Levi Stubbs	1936–2008	American	Four Tops	
Harry Styles	1994–	English	One Direction	
Bernard Sumner	1956–	British	Joy Division; New Order	
Kiefer Sutherland	1966–	Canadian		
Earl Sweatshirt	1994–	American	Odd Future	
David Sylvian	1958–	British	Japan	
Russ Taff	1953–	American	The Imperials; Gaither Vocal Band	
Serj Tankian	1967–	Armenian	System of a Down	
Lama Tashi	1968–	Indian		
Geoff Tate	1959–	American	Queensrÿche	
Corey Taylor	1973–	American	Slipknot (band); Stone Sour	
Eric Taylor	1949–2020	American		
James Taylor	1948–	American		
Otis Taylor	1948–	American		
Courtney Taylor-Taylor	1967–	American	The Dandy Warhols	
Jake Thackray	1938–2002 or 1939–2002	British		
Leon Thomas	1937–1999	American		
Ray Thomas	1941–2018	English	The Moody Blues	
Rob Thomas	1972–	American	Matchbox Twenty	
Marshall Thompson	1942–	American	The Chi-Lites	
Richard Thompson	1949–	British		
Timbaland	1972–	American	Swing Mob; Timbaland & Magoo	
Sakis Tolis	1972–	Greek	Rotting Christ	
Randy Travis	1959–	American		
Aaron Turner	1977–	American	Old Man Gloom; Sumac; Isis	
Alex Turner	1986–	British	Arctic Monkeys; The Last Shadow Puppets	
Conway Twitty	1933–1993	American		
Ty Dolla Sign	1982–	American		
Tyler, the Creator	1991–	American	I Smell Panties; Odd Future	
V (Note: V is also referred to as a baritenor and a tenor)	1995–	South Korean	BTS	
Ville Valo	1976–	Finnish	HIM	
Luther Vandross (Note: Some sources also refer to Vandross as a tenor)	1951–2005	American	Change; Chic	
David Vanian	1956–	British	The Damned; Phantom Chords	
Andrew VanWyngarden	1983–	American	MGMT	
Eddie Vedder	1964–	American	Pearl Jam	
Vinx	1957–	American	Jungle Funk	
Steve Von Till		American	Neurosis; Tribes of Neurot	
Vladimir Vysotsky	1938–1980	Russian		
Jason Wade (Note: Wade is also referred to as a tenor)	1980–	American	Lifehouse	
Scott Walker	1943–2019	American	The Walker Brothers	
Colter Wall	1995–	Canadian		
Charlie Waller	1935–2004	American	The Country Gentlemen	
Fetty Wap	1990– or 1991–	American		
Matthew Ward	1958–	American	2nd Chapter of Acts	
Justin Warfield	1973–	American	She Wants Revenge; One Inch Punch	
Brian Warner	1969–	American	Marilyn Manson	
Alex Warren	2000–	American		
Doc Watson	1923–2012	American		
Scott Weiland	1967–2015	American	Stone Temple Pilots; Velvet Revolver; Art of Anarchy	
Tony Joe White	1943–2018	American		
Gus Wickie	1885–1947	German-American		
Don Williams	1939–2017	American		
Joe Williams	1918–1999	American		
Paul Williams	1939–1973	American	The Temptations	
Charlie Wilson	1953–	American	The Gap Band	
Cameron Winter	2002–	American	Geese	
Bill Withers	1938–2020	American		
Nicky Wire	1969–	Welsh	Manic Street Preachers	
Patrick Wolf	1983–	British		
Bobby Womack	1944–2014	American	The Valentinos	
Roddy Woomble	1976–	Scottish	Idlewild	
Stevie Wright	1947–2015	English	The Easybeats	
Zakk Wylde	1967–	American	Black Label Society	
Yongguk	1990–	South Korean	B.A.P	
Chris Young	1985–	American		
Warren Zevon	1947–2003	American		

== See also ==
- List of basses in non-classical music
- List of contraltos in non-classical music
- List of mezzo-sopranos in non-classical music
- List of sopranos in non-classical music
- List of tenors in non-classical music
- Voice classification in non-classical music
- Voice type
