= Me Moan =

Studio album by Daughn Gibson
- Released: July 9, 2013
- Studio: Minbal, Chicago, Illinois
- Genre: Indietronica, indie pop, alternative country
- Length: 43:30
- Label: Sub Pop
- Producer: Daughn Gibson; Benjamin Balcom

Daughn Gibson chronology
All Hell (2011)	Me Moan (2013)

Singles from Me Moan
- 1. "The Sound of Law" Released: May 8, 2013

Professional ratings
Aggregate scores
Source	Rating
Metacritic	74/100
Review scores
Source	Rating
Allmusic	4/5 stars
Drowned In Sound	9/10

Me Moan is the second studio album by Daughn Gibson, an American singer-songwriter and the former drummer of Pearls and Brass. It was released in July 2013 under Sub Pop Records.

== Track list ==
No.	Title	Length
1.	"The Sound of Law"	2:55
2.	"Phantom Rider"	4:22
3.	"Mad Ocean"	3:34
4.	"The Pisgee Nest"	4:08
5.	"You Don't Fade"	3:22
6.	"Franco"	5:06
7.	"Won't You Climb"	3:48
8.	"The Right Signs"	3:55
9.	"Kissin' on the Blacktop"	3:45
10.	"All My Days Off"	3:54
11.	"Into The Sea"	4:41

== Personnel ==
- Daughn Gibson – vocals, production, mixing
- Melissa Bach – cello
- Nick Broste – trombone
- Justin Brown – pedal steel
- Jim Elkington – electric, baritone, acoustic nylon string guitar
- John Baizley – electric, acoustic guitar
- Matt Franco – electric guitar
- Benjamin Balcom – production, mixing
- Greg Calbi – mastering
