= Pitchfork Music Festival 2013 =

Music festival

- Dates: July 19–21, 2013
- Locations: Union Park, Chicago, United States
- Website: pitchforkmusicfestival.com

The Pitchfork Music Festival 2013 was held on July 19 to 21, 2013 at the Union Park, Chicago, United States. The festival was headlined by Björk, R. Kelly and Belle and Sebastian.

== Lineup ==
Headline performers are listed in boldface. Artists listed from latest to earliest set times.

Green
Friday, July 19	Saturday, July 20	Sunday, July 21
**Björk**; Wire; Mac DeMarco	**Belle and Sebastian**; The Breeders (Note: The Breeders performed a full set of their sophomore album Last Splash.); Savages; Phosphorescent; White Lung	**R. Kelly**; Toro y Moi; Yo La Tengo; Killer Mike; Tree

Red
Friday, July 19	Saturday, July 20	Sunday, July 21
Joanna Newsom; Woods; Daughn Gibson	Solange; Swans...And You Will Know Us by the Trail of Dead; Pissed Jeans	M.I.A. Lil B El-P; Foxygen

Blue
Friday, July 19	Saturday, July 20	Sunday, July 21
Mikal Cronin; Angel Olsen; Trash Talk; Frankie Rose	Rustie; Andy Stott; Low; Ryan Hemsworth; Metz; Merchandise; Parquet Courts; Julia Holter; KEN mode	TNGHT; Glass Candy; Evian Christ; Chairlift; Sky Ferreira; Waxahatchee; Blood Orange; Autre Ne Veut; DJ Rashad

The festival ended early Friday during headlining artist Bjork's performance due to bad weather.
