= Pearls and Brass =

Rock band

- Origin: Nazareth, Pennsylvania, U.S.
- Genres: Stoner rock, blues rock, hard rock, heavy metal
- Years active: 2001–present
- Label: Drag City

Pearls and Brass are a stoner rock band from Nazareth, Pennsylvania.

== History ==
The band members began playing together in 1996, but did not officially form the band until 2001. Their first recording, which is a self-titled LP, was released in 2003 by Doppelganger Records. The band's style was heavily influenced by 1970s classic rock, similar to bands such as Wolfmother. After the band was invited by Slint to open for them at England's All Tomorrow's Parties festival, the band drew attention from Drag City Records. Their 2006 release on Drag City, The Indian Tower, resulted in significant media attention in the United States.

The band went on hiatus in October 2008, as Randy Huth went on to play bass for Pissed Jeans. The group got back together in the spring of 2010 and played their first show back in their hometown of Nazareth, on December 18, 2010.

== Members ==
- Joel Winter-bass, vocals
- Randy Huth-guitar, vocals
- Josh Martin, drums

== Discography ==
- Pearls and Brass (Doppelganger Records, 2003)
- The Indian Tower (Drag City, 2006)
