= Daughn Gibson =

American musician (born 1981)

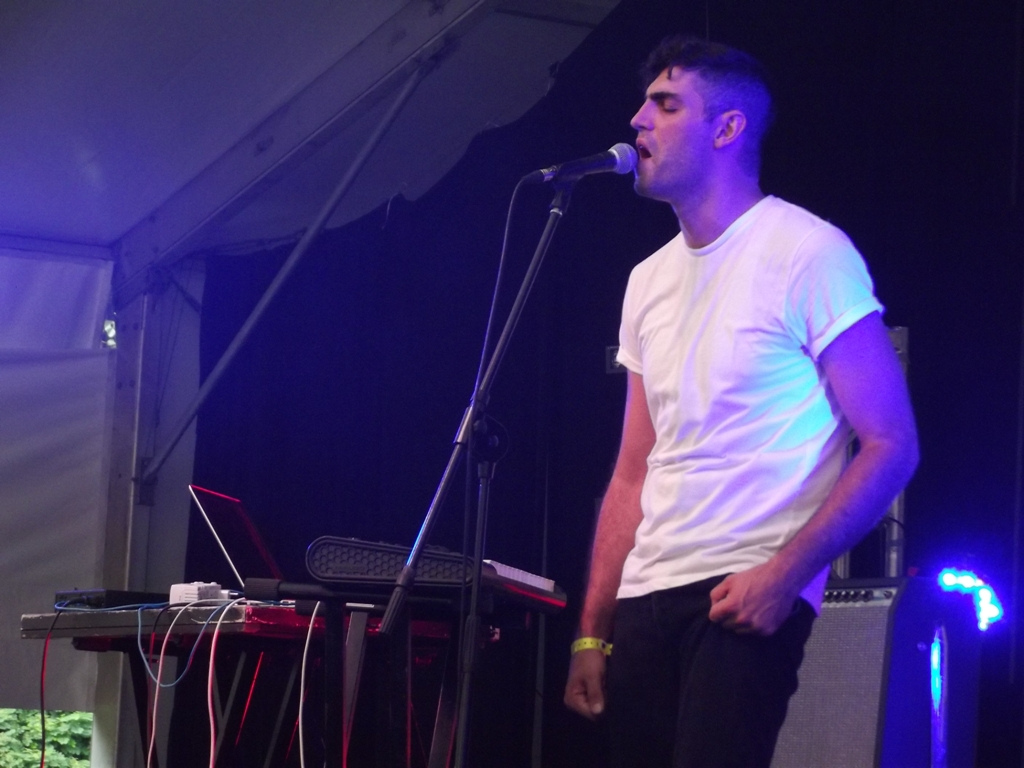
- Daughn Gibson at 2012 OFF Festival

Background information
- Born: Josh Martin; 1981 (age 44–45); Carlisle, Pennsylvania
- Occupation: Musician
- Years active: 2012–present
- Labels: Subpop, White Denim

Daughn Gibson (born Josh Martin, 1981) is an American singer-songwriter from Carlisle, Pennsylvania. He was formerly the drummer for Pearls and Brass. His debut album, All Hell, was released in 2012. The album received an 8.1/10 review from Pitchfork, as well as an 8.6/10 review from Playground.

In 2013 he released another album, Me Moan, with Sub Pop.

On June 2, 2015, he released his third album, Carnation, also with Sub Pop.

In June 2022, he self-released a six-song EP named Kriminelle Energie, available only on Bandcamp, his first new music since the 2016 EP Vas 1.

== Discography ==
=== Albums ===
- All Hell (2012, White Denim)
- Me Moan (2013, Sub Pop)
- Carnation (2015, Sub Pop)
