= Laboratoire de Phonétique et Phonologie =

CNRS laboratory in Paris, France

The Laboratoire de Phonétique et Phonologie (LPP) is a CNRS laboratory affiliated with the University of Paris III: Sorbonne Nouvelle in Paris, France. Its director is currently Pierre Hallé (who succeeded Jacqueline Vaissière and Annie Rialland). The LPP is a Mixed Research Unit (UMR 7018) with more than 40 members, including 7 researchers, 12 research professors, 3 engineers and more than 30 doctoral and post-doctoral students. It is specialized in teaching and research in experimental phonetics and in phonology, offering graduate-level courses leading to a doctoral degree. One of its central research themes is the development of an integrated approach to phonetics and phonology.

Its principal research areas have included:

- variation in spontaneous speech
- clinical phonetics
- Prosody (linguistics): analysis, typology, interfaces
- phonological systems: models, descriptive studies, typology
- development of tools for research and teaching
- acoustic phonetics and articulatory modelling

The laboratory is located at l'Institut de Phonétique de Paris on 19 rue des Bernardins. Research in clinical phonetics is conducted at the Service d'Oto-Rhino-Laryngologie (ORL) of the Hôpital Européen Georges-Pompidou (HEGP), Paris. In 2008 the CNRS gave the Laboratoire de Phonétique et Phonologie the task of creating a technological platform to study normal and pathological speech.

This platform includes:

- a large sound-insulated recording booth
- high quality sound recording equipment
- high-speed camera
- ultrasound tongue imaging
- electromyography
- electroglottography
- electropalatography
- non-invasive photoglottography
- photonasography
- kymograph
