= Electromagnetic articulography =

Method to measure position of mouth parts

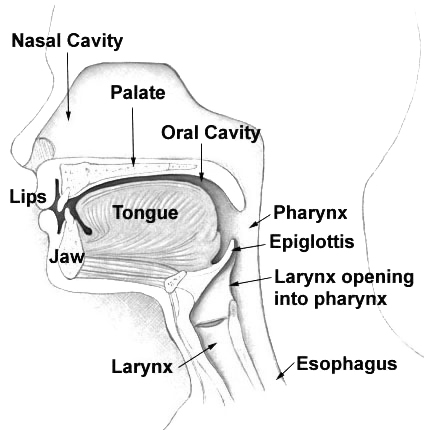
Midsagittal view of the human mouth. Transducer (sensor) coils are typically placed on the tongue and lips.

Electromagnetic articulography (EMA) is a method of measuring the position of parts of the mouth. EMA uses sensor coils placed on the tongue and other parts of the mouth to measure their position and movement over time during speech and swallowing. Induction coils around the head produce an electromagnetic field that creates, or induces, a current in the sensors in the mouth. Because the current induced is inversely proportional to the cube of the distance, a computer is able to analyse the current produced and determine the sensor coil's location in space.

EMA is used in linguistics and speech pathology to study articulation and in medicine to study oropharyngeal dysphagia. Other methods have been used to study articulation and ingestion with tradeoffs in the kind and amount of data available. Palatography allows the study of articulations that make contact with the palate such as some lingual consonants, but unlike EMA, palatographs cannot provide data on sounds which do not make contact such as vowels. Fluoroscopy and X-ray microbeam allow the investigation of non-contact movements of the mouth like EMA, but expose subjects to ionizing radiation which limits the amount of data that can be collected from a given participant.

== Principles of operation ==
The ability to observe the movements of articulators has been of great importance to the study of phonetics in order to understand the way sounds are produced.

Electromagnetic articulography uses the principle of electromagnetic induction to measure the position and movement of various points in and around the mouth. A helmet containing electromagnetic transmitters creates a variable magnetic field by running currents through the transmitters at different frequencies. Sensor coils placed midsagittally in the mouth produce current as they move through the magnetic field inversely proportional to the cube of the distance from the transmitters. The current induced alternates at the same frequency as the transmitter coil and the composite signal can be separated out to determine the distance from each individual coil, thus determining the position of the sensor in space.

In two-dimensional articulography, transmitter coils are placed in an equilateral triangle along the midsagittal plane at the forehead, chin, and neck. Because of the geometric orientation of the transmitter coils, accurate readings are able to be taken as long as the sensor coils placed on the tongue stay within about a centimeter of the midsagittal plane and are not angled at more than 30 degrees.

Articulographs able to measure in three dimensions use six transmitter coils organized in a spherical configuration. The transmitters are arranged so that the axis of a sensor coil is never perpendicular to more than three transmitters. Through the transmitter configuration and ability to measure in multiple dimensions, three-dimensional articulographs are able to make measurements outside of the midsagittal plane. 2D articulographs require restrictive headmounts to ensure that the subject's head does not move off the plane of measurement. Because 3D articulographs are able to measure outside of the midsagittal plane, a less restrictive headmount is able to be used.

=== Development of two and three dimensional sensors ===
Thomas Hixon was the first to describe the use of electromagnetic principles to measure articulation. In his 1971 letter to the editor, published in The Journal of the Acoustical Society of America, he described a setup using two sensor coils and one generator coil. The sensor coils, attached to the forehead and back of the neck, would remain stationary while the generator coil, attached to the jaw, would move creating variable currents in the sensor coils. These currents could then be used to determine the distance in two dimensions.

Early EMA systems like Hixon's had problems with accounting for tilting of the tongue during use as tilting of the sensor coils causes changes in the induced current that can skew data. In 1987, Paul Schönle et al. published an improved system that used three transmitter coils (analogous to Hixon's generator coil) and computer software to triangulate the position of sensor coils and account for tilt. However modern two-dimensional systems are still unable to compensate for tilting of sensors past 30 degrees and measurement is distorted if sensor coils are moved off the centerline of the mouth. In 1993, Andreas Zierdt published a description of an articulograph that would be able to measure movement in three dimensions, though three dimensional articulographs have only been commercially available since around 2009. Zierdt's conceptualization placed six transmitter coils equidistant from each other. Because sensor coils are dipoles, when they are perpendicular to a transmitter coil the current induced is zero, so Zierdt angled the transmitter coils so that for any given rotation of a sensor coil, it was not perpendicular to more than three transmitter coils allowing for at least three transmitter coils to triangulate the position of the sensor.

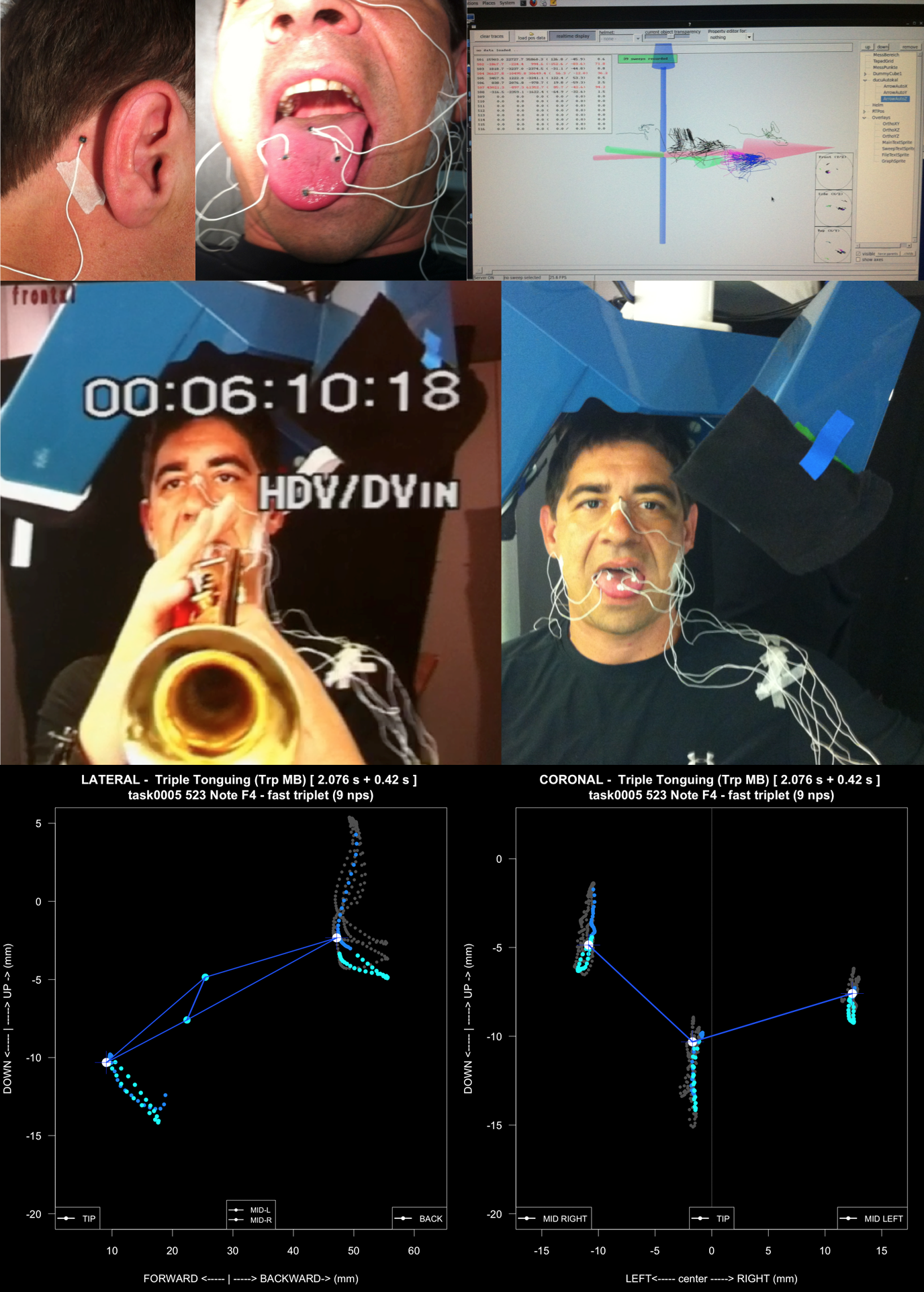
Visualisation of the tongue motions of a trumpet player

== Effect on subjects ==
As sensor coils are placed on the tongue of the subject, articulation may be affected depending on the placement of the coils, but no comparative analysis has shown whether articulation is altered because of the coils. The coils are about 3 mm in size and are not considered to be a particularly large source of error for measurements. Some researchers have found that subjects are irritated by sensor coils placed on the tip of the tongue which can lead to disturbed articulation. Similarly, the wires attached to the sensor coils can inhibit articulation if not run out the side of the mouth.

It has not been shown that long term exposure to electromagnetic fields is harmful to human health, but it is recommended to avoid subjects who are pregnant or who utilize pacemakers. Guidelines place the limit for safe continuous exposure between 100 μT and 200 μT. The field and frequencies output by electromagnetic articulographs are comparable to those put out by computer terminals with the maximum measured being about 10 μT.

== Alternative methods ==
Various diagnostic techniques preceded electromagnetic articulography.

=== Palatography and electropalatography ===
Palatography and electropalatography both measure contact of the tongue with the palate and thus are unable to measure articulations that do not make contact with the palate such as vowels.

Palatography involves the painting of a colored substance onto the tongue which is then transferred onto the palate during articulation. A picture is then taken of the palate to record the location of contact and, if another palatogram is to be taken, the mouth is washed out and the tongue repainted. A particularly low cost method that is often used in fieldwork, it can be difficult to collect large amounts of data.

Electropalatography involves the use of a custom-fitted artificial palate containing electrodes that measure contact. While able to record multiple contacts, the artificial palate may obstruct or interfere with articulation, and each subject requires a custom-fitted palate.

=== Video fluoroscopy ===
Video fluoroscopy uses X-ray radiation to produce moving pictures of the mouth during articulation or swallowing. It is considered the gold standard in studies of dysphagia because of its ability to take videos of the entire digestive tract during swallowing events. It is often used to study and treat aspiration of food, what parts of the digestive tract are malfunctioning during swallowing, and positions in which swallowing is easiest. Only limited data is able to be collected as sessions are typically limited to three minutes due to the hazards of radiation exposure. and it does not allow for fine grain analysis of tongue movements.

=== X-ray microbeam ===
Similar to video fluoroscopy, X-ray microbeam studies use radiation to study movements of articulators. Gold pellets, 2 to 3 mm in size, are placed in and around the mouth similar to the coils used in EMA. Radiation exposure is limited by using computer software to focus narrow X-ray beams, about 6 mm^{2}, on the pellets and track them as they move. Like EMA, X-ray microbeam studies are limited by the placement of the pellets. While able to minimize radiation exposure, the system is largely inaccessible as it is unique to the University of Wisconsin.
