= Voce faringea =

Singing technique

In vocal music, the term voce faringea (Italian pronunciation: [ˈvoːtʃe farinˈdʒɛːa]; translating to pharyngeal voice) describes a historical singing practice developed and used especially by the bel canto tenors of the late eighteenth and early nineteenth century to extend the upper range of the voice by modifying the falsetto, which is typically heard as a weak or feminine sound, into a vocal quality that is more tenoral and powerful.

== History ==
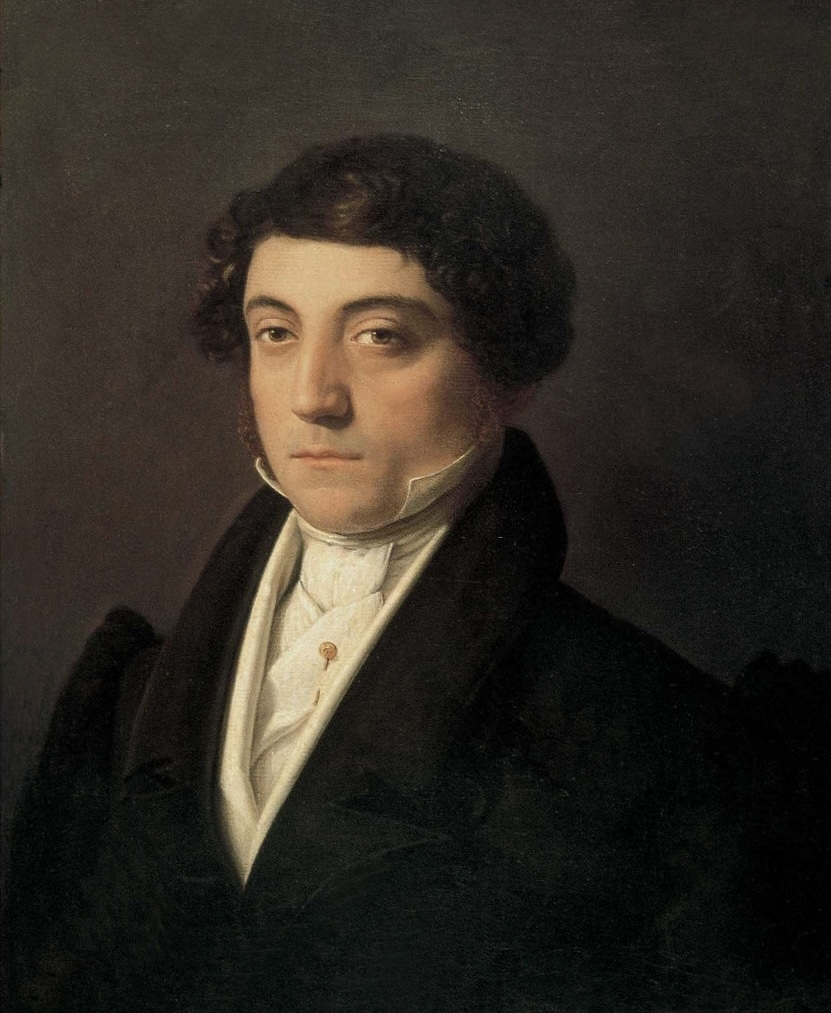
The bel canto-era composer Gioachino Rossini: portrait painted circa 1815 by Vincenzo Camuccini

Many tenor roles in the bel canto operas of the early 19th century have an exceptionally high tessitura with notes often well above C_{5} or D_{5}. The best-known example is probably Arturo’s arioso “Credeasi misera” from Vincenzo Bellini’s I Puritani, which is composed up to F_{5}. Normally, such high passages are beyond the vocal compass of modern tenors, raising the question of how tenors in the primo ottocento would have coped with such tessitura and extreme high notes.

The concept of the voce faringea offers an answer to this question. Tenors of this musical period were trained to strengthen and modify the falsetto into a more virile and powerful vocal quality. The resulting sound was considered homogenous with that of the lower register and no longer perceived as a falsetto timbre. This register mechanism mirrors a pre-romantic vocal ideal of sound that seems clearly divergent from those prevalent today.

In his 1851 work, the German singing teacher Ferdinand Sieber pointed out that tenors possessing this technique could sing with the greatest ease and practically without force up to highest tenor ranges. The quality of their high notes was so unlike a contemporary falsetto sound that it probably gave rise to the often-heard, and likely erroneous, opinion that they sang these high notes in chest voice. By balancing between vocal registers, the singer would gain a beautiful, marrow-like, mixed tone, seeming to retain the strength of chest voice and yet protect the voice as in falsetto, although without its feminine sound, as Friedrich Schmidt remarked in his 1854 vocal textbook. James Rennie wrote in 1825 that this vocal timbre was both the sweetest and the most brilliant sound the male voice could produce, possessing incomparably more pathos than any chest sound.

Eighteenth and 19th century vocal pedagogical literature employed various, confusing, and even contradictory terminology for the different voice registers; however, most vocal pedagogues were in agreement regarding the particular aesthetic merits of each register—mainly, chest and falsetto. In addition to these two registers, some vocal treatises of the era make mention of a third register mechanism tenors could employ to particular artistic advantage. It was often described as an intermediate register or a special mechanism connecting the falsetto and the chest register, and was perceived as a mixture of the two, often called voix mixte (mixed voice). Vocal maestri and physiologists used different terms to denote this vocal mechanism, including head voice, falsetto or fausset/faucet, voce mezzo-falso or middle-falsetto, Schlundkopfregister, feigned voice, voix sur-laryngienne, and voix pharyngienne (pharyngeal voice or voce faringea).

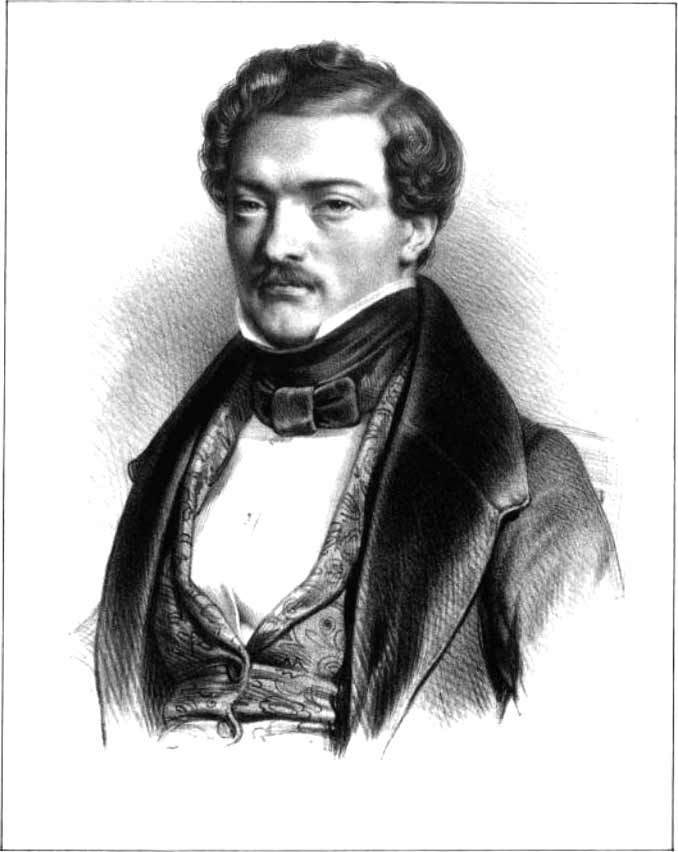
Gilbert Duprez

The term pharyngeal voice was coined by Edgar Herbert-Caesari and was first used to describe this particular vocal mechanism in his 1950 article “The Pharyngeal Voice,” in The Musical Times, and further in a chapter from his book The Voice of the Mind. Herbert-Caesari explains that the term pharyngeal voice is translated from the Italian voce faringea and was used by exponents of the “old school” solely to describe a peculiar tonal quality produced by a distinctive mechanism. He adds that the tenors of the Rossini/Bellini/Donizetti period were taught to sing with voce faringea and furthermore, that this method enabled (particularly) tenors to sing their highest notes with ease and brilliance.

In accordance with formerly prevalent vocal ideals, at least according to historical written sources, these tenori di grazia did not produce their voices with dramatic force but rather with elegance and suppleness up through their highest range. And yet the special vocal technique they employed to produce high notes considerably beyond C_{5} with absolute ease, security and facility gradually fell into obscurity.

During the second half of the 19th century, the vocal tradition of the great bel canto tenors ultimately went out of fashion, and a new, more dramatic verismo vocal ideal took hold. Musicological scholarship attributes Gilbert Louis Duprez’ interpretation of Arnold in Rossini’s Guillaume Tell, first in an 1831 performance in Luca, Italy, but more significantly in the 1837 Paris revival, as being a primary catalyst for this development. Duprez’ high C_{5} (ut de poitrine) was not sung in the traditional bel canto falsetto dominant vocal mechanism, as the famous tenori di grazia Adolphe Nourrit, John Braham, or Giovanni Battista Rubini had sung it, but rather in modal (chest) register, similar to contemporary tenors. Duprez’ ut de poitrine became the turning point after which the vocal ideal of the bel canto tenors, and subsequently the technique for developing voce faringea, were lost.

== Physiology and acoustics ==
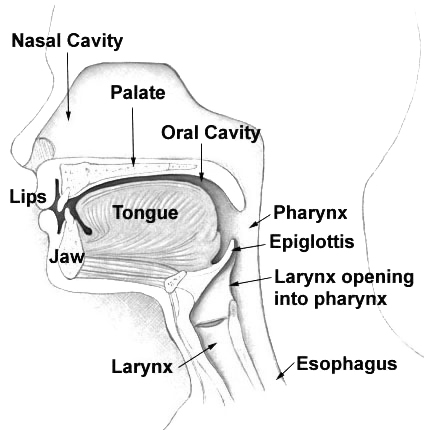
Vocal structures

Observations made by vocal pedagogues, medical doctors and physiologists, documented in several vocal treatises as well as physiological and anatomical writings from the early 19th century, are particularly revealing with regard to training different vocal registers in the corresponding operatic tradition. Accordingly, many authors have mentioned the importance of specific muscular adjustments in both the vocal tract and the larynx for producing the “mixed” (voce faringea) voice. Bennati, an ear, nose and throat specialist at the Paris Opera and trained singer, could study the physiological differences between vocal registers on himself and the best singers of the time. Both a contraction of the pharynx by lateral approximation of the pharyngeal walls in the area of the isthmus faucium and a narrowing of the aryepiglottic space were identified by him and other maestri and physiologists of that time as a requirement for the production of the mixed register. In addition, an increase of vocal folds mass by slightly altering the coordinative contraction of the thyroarytenoid (TA) and cricothyroid (CT) muscles and a strengthening of glottal adduction were mentioned as physiological basis for developing a falsetto tone into the mixed voice.

Recent scientific investigations including the analysis of electroglottogram and flow glottogram data as well as sound spectra of a falsetto dominant mixed phonation mode, also referred to as voce faringea, have provided evidence that may help to define certain characteristics of a forgotten singing practice of the bel canto tenors in the primo ottocento. Specific physiological and acoustic peculiarities of the voce faringea and a clear distinction from the falsetto and chest registers could be documented. Assumptions that the production of voce faringea requires peculiar configuration of both the laryngeal mechanism and the vocal tract were confirmed.

== Application for female and low male voices ==
As evidenced by various historical vocal textbooks and physiological writings, the voce faringea was primarily developed and used by the tenors of the early 19th for the top notes of the opera roles of the bel canto period. However, in his book The Voice of the Mind Edgar Herbert-Caesari explained that this voice function can be trained and applied also by baritones as well as by all female voices. He describes that the sound formation of the pharyngeal voice is possible for both female and male voices in the same frequency range, between F_{4} and D_{5} (expandable down to about C_{4} and upwards to F_{5}). For male voices, this voice register function can therefore be used in the high, for female voices in the medium and low ranges.

For baritones and bass voices, the voce faringea can be used for creating a light, flexible and graceful tone quality in medium and high ranges. It is particularly suitable for the interpretation of intimate and lyric moments in the art song as well as in the opera and oratorio repertoire.

Since in classical singing, female voices are trained to expand the head register into their low range, typically, tones down to B_{3} or A_{3} can also be produced in the light register mode. Nevertheless, many sopranos, mezzo-sopranos and altos feel that their voices are losing strength when singing low notes in head voice and that the phonation is in general becoming breathier and increasingly unstable below about E_{4} down. Here, the voce faringea concept offers female singers an effective vocal tool to concentrate and strengthen the sound of the head voice in the low range and to accomplish a soft and continuous transition into the chest register.

== Application in contemporary popular singing styles ==
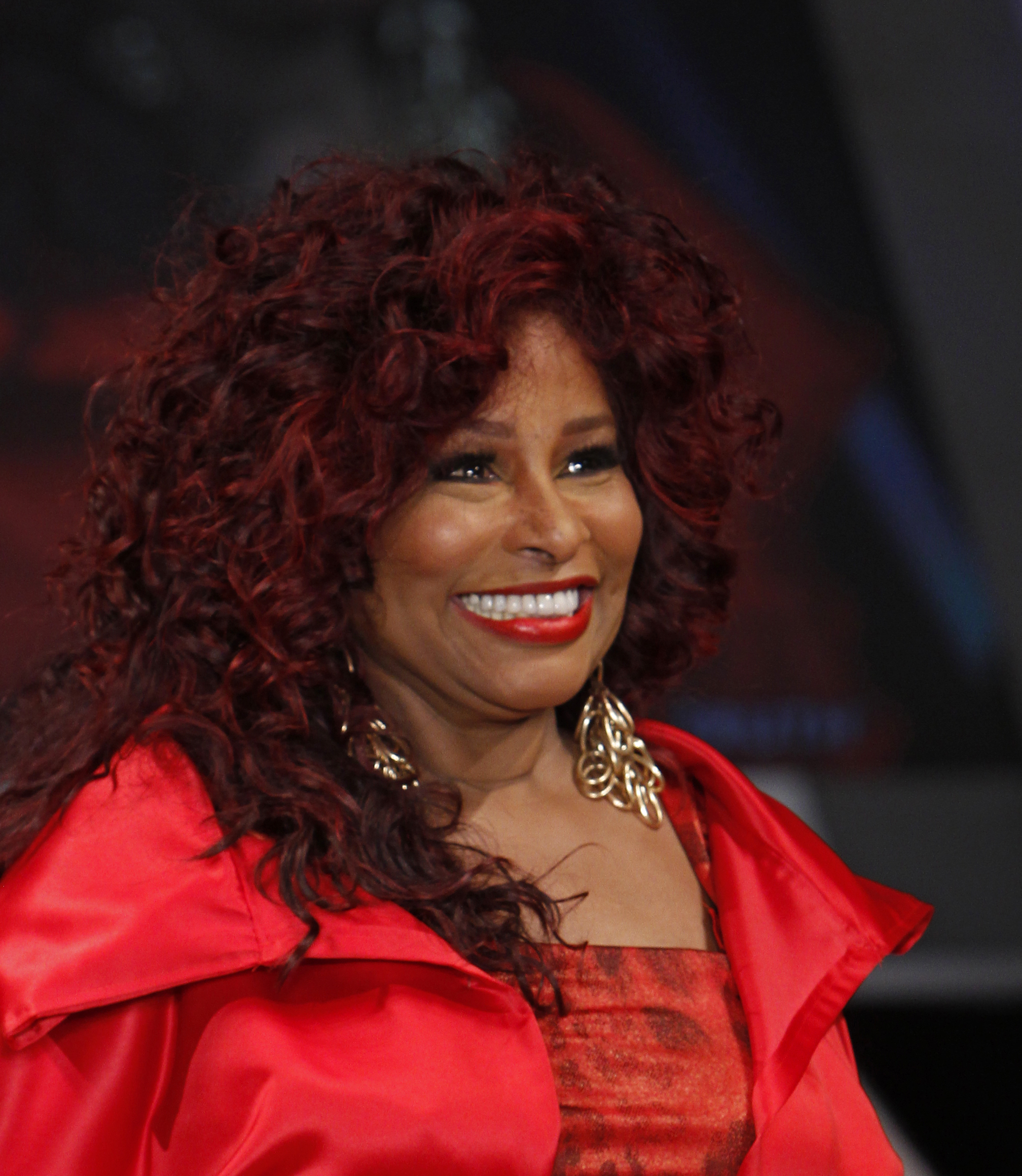
Chaka Khan

In recent years, the pharyngeal voice has been rediscovered also by representatives of the CCM (Contemporary Commercial Music) genres like Aretha Franklin, Natalie Cole, Chaka Khan, Stevie Wonder, Michael Jackson, Freddie Mercury, Axl Rose, Brian Johnson and Jon Bon Jovi as well as by well-known stars of the Broadway musical. In contemporary popular music singing styles the pharyngeal voice is typically seen as an effective coupling mechanism between the modal and falsetto registers and primarily used in semi-metallic and metallic phonation modes—for example by male rock and hard rock artists singing in exceptionally high vocal ranges similar to those of the high bel canto tenor repertoire of the early nineteenth century.

In addition, the pharyngeal voice can also be trained and used in a particularly effectively way by female CCM vocalists as an extension or partly replacement of the traditional belting technique, which is typically based on the laryngeal modal or chest register. Regarding the resonance strategy for both vocal mechanisms, which is in particular the aim to amplify metallic sound components, there can be found wide similarities for belting and the pharyngeal voice, why the latter is also known as Faux Belt or Fake Belt. However, by applying a comparably reduced vocal fold mass in falsetto mechanism and lower subglottic air pressure ratios, the pharyngeal voice can be used more flexible and economical in the high belting ranges with comparable sound intensity and voice power.
