= John Goldsmith =

John Goldsmith may refer to:

- John Goldsmith (cricketer) (1766–1845), English first-class cricketer
- John Goldsmith (footballer) (born 1931), Australian rules footballer
- John Goldsmith (linguist) (born 1951), American linguist
- John G. Goldsmith (1909–1972), British agent for the Special Operations Executive during World War II
- Jonathan Goldsmith (musician), Canadian musician, arranger, producer and composer.
- Jack Goldsmith (born 1962), American attorney and Harvard Law School professor

== See also ==
- Goldsmith Book Prize, literary award for books published in the United States.
