= Annie Rialland =

French linguist (b. 1948)

- Born: 17 March 1948 (age 78); Jans, France
- Children: 2

Academic background
- Education: Paris Descartes University
- Thesis: Une langue à tons en terrasses, le gulmancema (1978)

Academic work
- Discipline: Linguist

Annie Rialland (born March 17, 1948, in Jans, near Nantes, France) is a French linguist who is Director of Research emerita of the CNRS Laboratory of Phonetics and Phonology (Paris). Her main domains of expertise are phonetics, phonology, prosody, and African languages.

== Education and research ==
In 1978 Rialland defended her doctoral thesis, "Une langue à tons en terrasses, le gulmancema" at the University of Paris 5. In 1988 she defended her thèse d’état, "Systèmes prosodiques africains ou fondements empiriques pour un modèle multilinéaire," at the University of Nice.

From the beginning, her scientific approach combined phonetic and phonological perspectives (autosegmental phonology, in particular). Over the years, her work investigated a broad range of languages, mainly African (from various language families: Gur, Mandé, Atlantic, Bantu), but also French and the whistled language of La Gomera. She has also supervised doctoral theses on the phonetics and phonology of a diverse range of languages (Berber, Bantu languages, Japanese, among others).

== Career at the LPP ==
With Jacqueline Vaissière, Rialland co-directed the Laboratory of Phonetics and Phonology (LPP) in Paris for 15 years, from 1991 to 2006. Under their direction, the research orientation of the LPP turned towards integrating phonology and phonetics, based on experimental methods.

While at the LPP, Rialland was involved in a number of international collaborative projects funded by leading funding agencies. She co-directed, with Laura J. Downing, a French-German ANR-DFG project, BANTUPSYN, devoted to the Phonology-syntax Interface in Bantu languages (2009–2012). Rialland was one of the co-pilots of DIAREF, a project on child language acquisition (2010–2013). From 2015 to 2018 Rialland was a member of the French-German ANR-DFG project, BULB, which aims to apply cutting edge speech technologies to help document and analyze unwritten languages (2015–2018).

== Honors ==
Rialland was President of the Société de Linguistique de Paris in 2016. She received an Honor Award from the West African Linguistic Society in 2017. In 2019 she was elected to the Academy of Europe.

== Personal life ==
She was married to G. Nick Clements, an American theoretical phonologist; they are the parents of two children, William R. Clements and Celia A. Clements.

== Selected publications ==
- Clech-Darbon, Anne; Rebuschi, Georges; Rialland, Annie (1999). "Are There Cleft Sentences in French?". The Grammar of Focus. Linguistik Aktuell/Linguistics Today. Vol. 24. p. 83. doi:10.1075/la.24.04cle. ISBN 978-90-272-2745-4.
- Clements, G., & Rialland, A. (2007). Africa as a phonological area. In B. Heine & D. Nurse (Eds.), A Linguistic Geography of Africa (Cambridge Approaches to Language Contact, pp. 36–85). Cambridge: Cambridge University Press. doi:10.1017/CBO9780511486272.004
- Downing, Laura J.; Rialland, Annie (2016). Intonation in African Tone Languages. doi:10.1515/9783110503524. ISBN 9783110503524.
- Rialland, Annie (2005). "Phonological and phonetic aspects of whistled languages". Phonology. 22 (2): 237–271. doi:10.1017/S0952675705000552. S2CID 18615779.
- Rialland, Annie (2007). "Question prosody: An African perspective". Tones and Tunes: Typological Studies in Word and Sentence Prosody. Phonology and Phonetics. Vol. 1. pp. 35–62. doi:10.1515/9783110207569.35. ISBN 978-3-11-019057-1.
- Rialland, Annie; Robert, Stéphane (2001). "The intonational system of Wolof". Linguistics. 39 (5). doi:10.1515/ling.2001.038.
