= Median consonant =

Consonant sound

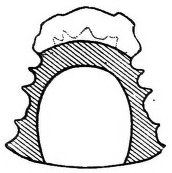
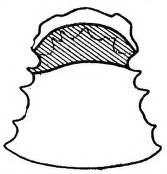
Palatograms of median [t] and lateral [l]

A median consonant, also known as a central consonant (not to be confused with the articulation of a central vowel), is a consonant sound that is produced when air flows along the midline of the mouth over the tongue. The class contrasts with lateral consonants, in which air flows over one or both sides of the tongue. In English, all consonants but /l/ are median. It is uncommon to explicitly describe a consonant in a language as median: generally, if a consonant is not described as lateral, it is assumed to be median, and in the IPA chart the median consonants are all those not specified as lateral.

The term is most relevant for approximants and fricatives (for which there are contrasting lateral and median consonants), for example median [ɹ] versus lateral [l] among approximants and median [z] versus lateral [ɮ] among fricatives. There are no purely lateral plosives, but plosives can have a lateral release, which may be written in the International Phonetic Alphabet using a superscript l, e.g. [tˡ], or may be implied with a following lateral letter, e.g. [tɬ]. The labial fricatives [f v] often—perhaps usually—have lateral rather than central airflow, as occlusion between the teeth and lips blocks the airflow in the center, but nonetheless they are not defined as lateral consonants because no language makes a distinction between the two.

In some languages, the laterality of a phoneme may be indeterminate. In Japanese, for example, there is a tap consonant /r/ that may be either median or lateral, resulting in e.g. /ro/ being produced as either median [ɾo] or lateral [ɺo].

== See also ==
- Manner of articulation
- Sulcalization
- List of phonetics topics
