= Voice classification in non-classical music =

Voice classification in non-classical music is defined as specific vocal timbres unique to each vocal range. These timbres are produced by classical training techniques.

== Overview ==
The term "non-classical music" typically describes music in jazz, pop, blues, soul, country, folk, and rock styles. In the United States, the term contemporary commercial music (CCM) is used by some vocal pedagogues. Voice classification systems and vocal type terms were initially created for the purpose of classifying voices specifically within classical singing. As new styles of music developed, musicians and teachers sought common terms for vocalists in these styles, and so the existing classical music terminology was loosely applied. This approach has led to a system with many different names for the same term or style.

=== Approaches in classical music ===
There are two overall approaches within voice classification: one for opera vocalists and one for choral music parts. One of the major differences between these two in classifying voices is that choral music classifies voices entirely on vocal range, whereas in opera classification systems many other factors are considered. Indeed, tessitura (where the voice feels most comfortable singing) and vocal timbre (the innate quality of the voice's sound) are more important factors than vocal range within opera categorization. Within opera there are several systems in use, including the German Fach system, the Italian opera tradition, and French opera tradition.

All of these approaches to voice classification use some of the same terminology, which often leads to confusion. In the operatic systems there are six basic voices, and each type has several subtypes. These basic types are traditionally soprano, mezzo-soprano, and contralto for women, and tenor, baritone, and bass for men. Within choral music, the system is collapsed into only four categories for adult singers: soprano and alto for women, and tenor and bass for men. In England, the term "male alto" is used to refer to a man who uses falsetto vocal production to sing in the alto section of a chorus. This practice is much less common outside of the UK where the term countertenor is more often applied. Countertenors are also widely employed within opera as solo vocalists. The term male alto is never used to refer to a solo vocalist. Children's voices, both male and female, are described as trebles, although the term boy soprano is widely used as well.

=== Application to non-classical singing ===
It is difficult to use this framework for non-classical singing. Specific classical techniques, through study and training, result in a particular kind of vocal production and vocal timbre for each voice type that is unique to classical music. This is particularly problematic when trying to apply the operatic terms, as the vocal types are more descriptive of vocal timbre and vocal facility than simple vocal range. For example, one category of voice in opera is a contralto, which is the lowest female voice in the operatic system. One of the qualifying characteristics of this voice is a deep and dark quality to the vocal sound. This quality is not entirely innate to the voice but is developed through classical vocal training. This means that although a singer in another genre might have a range equivalent to a contralto, they might not have a similar sound.

These differences in voice qualities are reflections on variation in the muscular, aerodynamic, and acoustical conditions in the larynx and in the vocal tract. The subglottic pressure, the driving force in phonation, needs to be adapted in accordance with the laryngeal conditions. In other words, the very act of singing consistently within one technique or another causes the voice to physically develop in different ways and thus changes the timbre of that particular voice.

Another example would be a coloratura soprano in opera. This is not only the highest female voice in opera but also distinguished by its ability to perform fast leaps, trills, and runs with free movement within the highest part of the voice. A non-opera singer might be able to sing as high as a coloratura soprano but may need training in classical technique to be able to perform the vocal acrobatics that a classically trained soprano can. Therefore, the sub-categories in opera (lyric, dramatic, coloratura, soubrette, spinto, etc.) are not applicable to non-classical singing, simply because they are too closely associated with classical vocal technique.

A second problem in applying these systems is a question of range specification, which is why the choral music classification system does not fit well with non-classical singers. The choral system was developed to delineate polyphonic structure and was not really intended to designate a vocal type to individual singers. In other words, choral music was designed to be broken down into four vocal sections and it is the sections themselves that are labelled soprano, alto, tenor, and bass, not the individual singers. For example, most women that sing the alto line in choirs would be considered mezzo-sopranos in opera due to their vocal timbre and their particular range resting somewhere in the middle between a soprano and contralto. A small portion of them, however, would most likely be contraltos. Therefore, one could say, "I am a mezzo-soprano singing the alto line", and another could say, "I am a contralto singing the alto line." They would have two different ranges and sounds, but they would be singing the same part. This is important to understand, because it indicates that choral music emphasizes vocal range within a specific type of music rather than vocal type.

It is not uncommon for men with higher voices to sing the alto line or women with lower voices to sing the tenor line. However, within the classical vocal type system, a woman who sings the tenor line would typically be considered a contralto, and a man who the sings alto or soprano a countertenor or sopranist.

That being said, non-classical singers can adopt some of the terms from both systems when classifying their voices. The six-part structure of the operatic system is much preferable to the four-part choral system for non-classical singers because it has three sets of vocal ranges instead of two to choose from. Most people's voices fall within the middle categories of mezzo-soprano and baritone. There are also a fair number of tenors and sopranos, but true basses and contraltos are rare. A non-classical singer could use the list that follows.

== Vocal categories and ranges for classical singers ==
The ranges given below are approximations and are not meant to be too rigidly applied.

- Soprano: the highest female voice, being able to sing C_{4} (middle C) to C_{6} (high C), and possibly higher
- Mezzo-soprano: the middle female voice, between A_{3} (A below middle C) and A_{5} (two octaves above A_{3})
- Contralto: the lowest female voice, F_{3} (F below middle C) to E_{5} (two Es above middle C). Rare contraltos possess a range similar to the tenor
- Tenor: the highest male voice, B_{2} (2nd B below middle C) to A_{4} (A above Middle C), and possibly higher
- Baritone: the middle male voice, G_{2} (two Gs below middle C) to F_{4} (F above middle C)
- Bass: the lowest male voice, E_{2} (two Es below middle C) to E_{4} (the E above middle C)

Although uncommon, some men, usually in falsetto voice, can sing in the higher ranges. Within classical music, these singers are instead called countertenors. Within contemporary music, however, the use of the term tenor for these male voices would be more appropriate.

== Vocal pedagogical methods for contemporary commercial music ==
Teaching voice within non-classical music is an emerging field. Up to this point, voice teachers and voice research have been largely concentrated with classical methods of singing. However, new approaches and methods to teaching non-classical voice have recently emerged, such as the complete vocal technique (CVT) by Cathrine Sadolin at Complete Vocal Institute or speech level singing (SLS) by Seth Riggs. Another example is Jeannette LoVetri's method known as somatic voice work. Only within the past few years have music conservatories and music programs within universities begun to embrace these alternative methodologies suitable to other kinds of vocal music.

== See also ==
- Singers with a six-octave or greater vocal range
- Singers with a five-octave vocal range
- Singers with a four-octave vocal range
- Singers with a three-octave vocal range
- List of basses in non-classical music
- List of baritones in non-classical music
- List of tenors in non-classical music
- List of contraltos in non-classical music
- List of mezzo-sopranos in non-classical music
- List of sopranos in non-classical music
- Vocal register
- Voice type
- Fach
