= Jacqueline Vaissière =

French linguist

- Born: 24 August 1946 (age 80); Mont-Saint-Martin, France
- Education: University of Grenoble
- Occupations: Linguist, phonetician, researcher, university professor

Jacqueline Vaissière (born 24 August 1946 in Mont-Saint-Martin, France) is a French phonetician.

== Career ==
Vaissière studied computing and automatic language translation under the supervision of Bernard Vauquois, at Centre d’Études et de Traduction Automatique, University of Grenoble, where she earned her PhD in 1971. She joined the Speech Communication Group at MIT (headed by Pr. Ken Stevens), where she acquired a specialization in acoustic phonetics.

When the speech processing community moved towards black box models for recognition and synthesis, Jacqueline Vaissière left the Centre National d'études des Télécommunications and chose to become a professor at the Sorbonne Nouvelle, where she succeeded René Gsell in 1990. Together with Annie Rialland, Jacqueline Vaissière headed the Phonetics and Phonology Laboratory at Paris 3/CNRS: Laboratoire de Phonétique et Phonologie until 2013.

From 2011–2014 she coordinated the 10-year project “Laboratoire d’Excellence“ Empirical Foundations of Linguistics (EFL).

In 2010, she was elected as a member of Institut Universitaire de France.

== Distinctions ==
Vaissière was awarded the CNRS Silver Medal in 2009, at the joint suggestion of its Human and Social Sciences department (InSHS) and its computing/engineering department (InS2I).

Chevalier de la Légion d'Honneur (2011)

Officiel de l'Ordre National du Mérite (2015)

Who's who? since 2010

She was elected as ISCA fellow in 2014: "For her pioneering works in clinical phonetics and her immense role at the interface between phonetics, phonology and speech engineering".

== Selected publications ==
- Vaissière, Jacqueline. 1971. Contribution à la synthèse par règles du français. PhD dissertation. Grenoble.
- Vaissière, Jacqueline. 1975. Further note on French prosody. Research Laboratory of Electronics, MIT, Quarterly Progress Report 115. 251–262.
- Vaissière, Jacqueline. 1983. Language-independent prosodic features. In Anne Cutler & Robert Ladd (eds.), Prosody: Models and Measurements, 53–66. Berlin: Springer Verlag.
- Vaissière, Jacqueline. 1985. The use of prosodic parameters in automatic speech recognition. Computer, Speech and language. Prentice-Hall International.
- Vaissière, Jacqueline. 1986. Variance and Invariance at the Word Level. In Joseph S. Perkell & Dennis Klatt (eds.), Invariance and Variability in Speech Process, 534–539. Lawrence Erlbaum Associates.
- Vaissière, Jacqueline. 1988. Prediction of velum movement from phonological specifications. Phonetica 45. 122–139.
- Vaissière, Jacqueline. 1995. Phonetic explanations for cross-linguistic similarities. Phonetica 52. 123–130.
- Vaissière, Jacqueline. 2004. The Perception of Intonation. In David B. Pisoni & Robert E. Remez (eds.), Handbook of Speech Perception, 236–263. (Blackwell Textbooks in Linguistics). Oxford, U.K. & Cambridge, Massachusetts: Blackwell.
- Vaissière, Jacqueline. 2006, La Phonétique, Presses Universitaires de France (translated in Japanese and Arabic)
