= René Gsell =

French linguist and phonetician

René Gsell (1921–2000) was a French linguist and phonetician.

== Career ==
Starting in 1955, when he was appointed at the University of Grenoble, Gsell undertook to develop its Institute of Phonetics into an internationally recognized laboratory.

Gsell was appointed General Secretary of the Permanent Council for the Organization of International Congresses of Phonetic Sciences in 1961.

He founded the journal Revue Langage et Comportement, first published in 1965.

In the iconoclastic fever of the May 1968 events in France, Gsell was criticized as a representative of old-style, retrograde scholarship and had to discontinue his teaching in Grenoble. He was offered positions as professor in Australia (Monash University, Clayton), Canada (Simon Fraser University, Vancouver), the Netherlands (Nijmegen University), and in Paris, at the Sorbonne Nouvelle, a position which he accepted and held until his retirement. He was succeeded by Jacqueline Vaissière.

== Fields of research ==
Gsell's interests in linguists were broad: beyond experimental phonetics, he kept up to date on publications about general linguistics, dialectology, Romance linguistics, models of syntax, and applied mathematics.

In addition to classical languages such as Greek, Latin, Sanskrit and Old Persian, he knew Old Norse and Gothic. He also knew Thai (Siamese) and acquired some first-hand knowledge of a considerable range of languages.

== Bibliography ==
- Gsell, René. 1979a. Etudes et recherches tonales (Contribution à la typologie tonale). Paris: Université de la Sorbonne Nouvelle,.
- Gsell, René. 1979b. La prosodie du thai standard: tons et accent. Paris: Université Paris 3-Sorbonne Nouvelle, Institut de Phonétique.
- Gsell, René. 1979c. Remarques sur la structure de l’espace tonal en vietnamien du sud (parler de Saïgon). Paris: Université de la Sorbonne Nouvelle, Institut d’études linguistiques et phonétiques.
- Gsell, René. 1979d. Sur la réalisation chuchotée des tons du thai standard. Paris: Institut d’Etudes Linguistiques et Phonétiques, Université de la Sorbonne Nouvelle.
- Gsell, René. 1985. Hauteurs spécifiques, types consonantiques et tons statiques en thai. In Ratanakul Suriya, David Thomas & Premsrirat Suwilai (eds.), Southeast Asian Linguistic Studies presented to André-G. Haudricourt, 389–427. Bangkok: Mahidol University.
- † Gsell, René. 2001. The consonantal system of common Romani: a diasystemic approach. In Études de linguistique générale et contrastive: Hommage à Jean Perrot, ed. by Anne-Marie Löffler-Laurian, 169-186. Paris: CRELS (Centre de Recherche sur les Langues et les Sociétés).
