= Complete Vocal Institute =

Educational institution in Copenhagen, Denmark

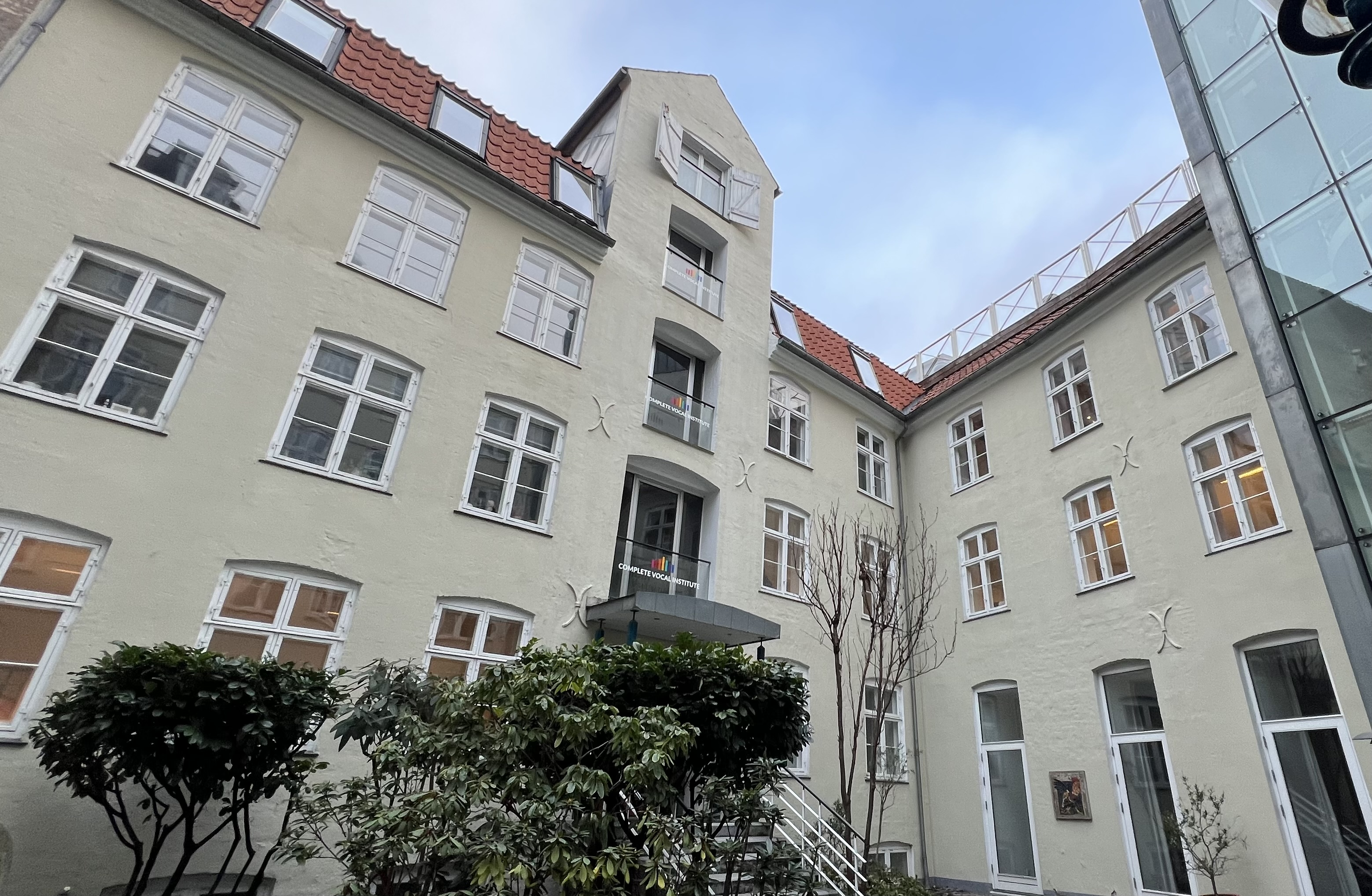
- Complete Vocal Institute, Copenhagen
- Other name: CVI
- Motto: Europe’s largest institute for singers
- Founder: Catherine Sadolin
- Established: 2005
- Mission: “For all singers from all genres of music, who wish to improve their singing skills and artistic development.”
- Administrative Manager: Susanne Meyer
- Location: Kompagnistræde 32 A 1208, Copenhagen, Denmark
- Website: https://completevocal.institute/contacts/

The Complete Vocal Institute (Danish: Komplet Vocal Institute) also known as CVI, is a private vocal and music institution located in Copenhagen, Denmark. The Institute specialises in the theoretical basis and practical application of the Complete Vocal Technique (often abbreviated to CVT), a technique for vocalists developed by singer and voice researcher Cathrine Sadolin.

Formed in 2005, the Complete Vocal Institute offers, multi-day, three month, one year and three year courses which have helped it grow into one of the largest singing and vocal institutes in Europe, with 528 authorised teachers to-date and thousands of graduates from over 30 countries worldwide.

The theoretical and practical basis for the institute, the Complete Vocal Technique, is also the name of a book on vocal techniques written and published by Cathrine Sadolin. The educational book Complete Vocal Technique includes audio examples and exercises which have now been published in seven languages: Danish, Swedish, Finnish, English, Dutch, French and German. Demand for courses at the institute have been periodically increasing making CVI, in both 2007 and 2008, among Denmark’s fastest growing companies.

== Complete Vocal Technique ==
“Complete Vocal Technique,” or CVT, is an internationally widespread method for teaching voice. CVT is divided into four main principles, and by combining parts of these principles singers can produce the sounds they want. This also makes it possible to pinpoint and correct specific problems and errors without having to change the parts the singer are happy with.

=== The four principles ===
- Three basic principles (to ensure vocal health)
- Four modes: Neutral, Curbing, Overdrive, and Edge (to select the desired "gear" to sing in)
- Sound color (making the voice brighter or darker)
- Effects (to acquire special sounds)

CVI sees all sounds as equal and all sounds can be made in a healthy way. Singing technique is therefore a technique for all styles of singing. Authorized CVT teachers should not express their personal taste. It is only the singer who decides what he or she wants to work with, and it's only the singer who has influence on the final result.

When the method is called Complete Vocal Technique it refers to the idea that the techniques cover all the sounds the human voice can produce. The method is not perceived as complete in the sense that there is no room for improvement. Research is ongoing and techniques are updated regularly. The goal of Complete Vocal Institute is to explain the voice in a simple and understandable manner and ensure that the desired sounds are produced in a healthy way, so that the singers avoid damage to their voice.

== The courses ==
Singers with a professional or semi-professional background can apply for admission to a number of courses of varying length and content. Singers can choose to follow the courses in Copenhagen or in a number of countries, where there are authorized CVT teachers. The shortest courses are 1–5 days while it takes three years to become a licensed CVT teacher. Singers who want to focus exclusively on their own singing can choose between courses of three months to one year. Subsequently, the singers can choose to continue on so-called Advanced courses.

The 3-year singer/teacher-education - is required to be licensed as an Authorised CVT Teacher. The first 23 teachers completed the course in 2005 and were assigned to CVI when the Institute opened the same year. Today (2012) there are 131 licensed CVT teachers from 12 countries and a further 128 are taking the course. Teachers are trained in identifying the singers' learning type and adapting the tuition after each singer. There is a large age spread among the singers at the teacher education and they come from the Nordic countries and Europe. There are also trained teachers from countries such as Egypt, Philippines and USA. After graduating as a CVT-teacher their typically teach at conservatories, universities, theaters, studios, music schools and privately.

== Background and research ==
The education system used on CVI is created by Cathrine Sadolin. Due to asthma from childhood she received singing lessons to control her breathing. Because of the illness, she had to develop her own techniques to produce the desired sounds. Her first step was to understand the body and the vocal physiology and she experimented with producing the desired sounds in other ways than the already known methods.

Through research of the anatomy and physiology and all types of singers, she found out that there is an underlying structure behind the sounds that a human can do. This was divided into four different modes that cover all the sounds the human voice can produce. She worked also with a range of professional singers to try out the techniques, when they wanted to produce specific sounds or had problems with their voice. The work formed the basis for the techniques Complete Vocal Institute currently uses and Cathrine Sadolin has continued the voice research together with physicians and acousticians. Cathrine Sadolin has been invited to speak in the voice conferences in Europe and USA since 1996.

In 2007, she started to collaborate with consultant ENT Surgeon Julian McGlashan from Nottingham University Hospital. Their first joint research study was published in February 2007 on auditive research, where speech therapists had to determine which voice modes was used by listening to song samples. After that they cooperated to show the laryngeal gestures in the various effects e.g. distortion, growl, grunt, creaks and creaking, rattle, Scream, vocal breaks, etc.

Since then they have worked with visual detection, where test subjects had to determine the different singing modes without hearing the sound, but by looking at photos and videos of the larynx during singing, recorded with an endoscope camera. The camera is led in through the nose so it can record the vocal folds and larynx movements during singing. Furthermore EGG measurements where electrodes are placed on the larynx to record the vocal movements during singing and speaking are used to detect the various vocal modes.

Currently (2012) Cathrine Sadolin and Julian McGlashan are researching the terminology used in describing singing and the use of the voice.

Together with sound specialist Eddy B. Brixen (from DPA) and EBB-consult, there is ongoing research in making spectral analysis of the sound spectrum, the voice produces with the various modes.

In addition to testing the techniques in a scientific way another goal is that an outsider will be able to identify the different voice modes on a purely objective basis, without prior knowledge of singing.
