= Photoglottography =

Photoglottography or photo-electric glottography is a laboratory technique for investigating the opening and closing of the glottis in the larynx. It detects variations in the amount of light that can pass through the glottis as it opens and closes.

== Transillumination of the glottis ==
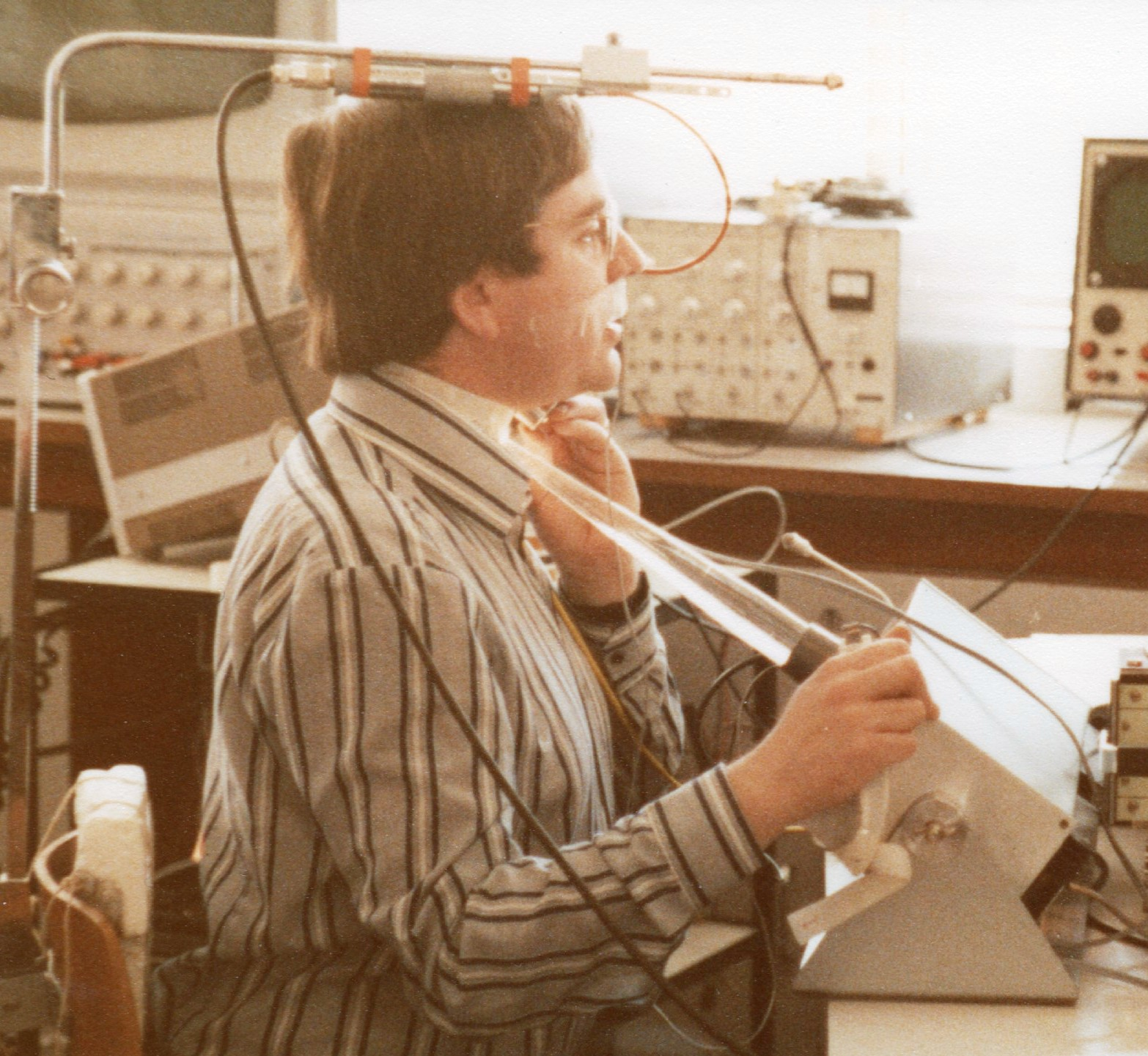
Photo-electric glottograph in use

It was observed by Czermak in 1861 that the inside of the trachea could be illuminated from outside the neck, in what he called illumination by transparency, and the resulting light passing through the glottis observed with a laryngoscopic mirror. Electronic techniques making use of this observation began to be used in the mid-twentieth century. Instruments such as that designed and manufactured by B. Frøkjaer-Jensen, have used the combination of a light source illuminating the trachea from below, and a light-sensitive cell positioned above the glottis in the pharynx to detect light passing through the glottis. This cell is fixed near the end of a thin tube inserted through the nose and nasal passages (which leaves the articulators relatively free to move in speech); in the Frøkjaer-Jensen instrument the tube is extended so that a few centimetres can be swallowed into the oesophagus in order to anchor the light-sensitive cell securely in place. The light from a light source is carried to the neck by a tapered perspex rod pressed against the neck immediately below the thyroid cartilage; alternatively, a cold light source may be applied directly to the neck.

== Photoglottography in speech research ==
Two main areas have been explored with this technique.

=== Examination of vocal fold vibration ===
A number of researchers have attempted to compare the photoglottograph output with measurements of glottal opening based on high-speed or stroboscopic film during phonation. If the two were closely similar, the photoglottograph would represent a quicker and cheaper method of analysis of phonation. However, Baken reports variable results: a study by Coleman and Wendahl concluded that "relating photoglottographic waveforms ... to glottal area is not only hazardous but invalid in many cases", while a later study by Harden found that the photoglottograph provided "essentially the same information on glottal area function as that provided by ultrahigh-speed photography"

=== Detection of large-scale glottal opening and closing ===
In addition to the study of vocal fold vibratory patterns, the technique may be used to detect the opening of the glottis for voiceless consonants or the closure of the glottis for glottalic consonants and glottal stop.

== Clinical applications ==
Photoglottography has been evaluated for usefulness in the study of dysphonic patients in the clinic. The technique is thought to be useful in reflecting the phonatory effect of Parkinson's disease.

== See also ==
- Electroglottograph
