= Autosegmental phonology =

Formal framework in linguistics

Autosegmental phonology is a framework of phonological analysis proposed by John Goldsmith in his PhD thesis in 1976 at the Massachusetts Institute of Technology (MIT).

As a theory of phonological representation, autosegmental phonology developed a formal account of ideas that had been sketched in earlier work by several linguists, notably Bernard Bloch (1948), Charles Hockett (1955) and J. R. Firth (1948). According to such a view, phonological representations consist of more than one linear sequence of segments; each linear sequence constitutes a separate tier. The co-registration of elements (or autosegments) on one tier with those on another is represented by association lines. There is a close relationship between analysis of segments into distinctive features and an autosegmental analysis; each feature in a language appears on exactly one tier.

The working hypothesis of autosegmental analysis is that a large part of phonological generalizations can be interpreted as a restructuring or reorganization of the autosegments in a representation. Clear examples of the usefulness of autosegmental analysis came in early work from the detailed study of African tonal languages, as well as the study of vowel and nasal harmony systems. A few years later, John McCarthy proposed an important development by showing that the derivation of words from consonantal roots in Arabic could be analyzed autosegmentally.

In the first decade of the development of the theory, G. N. Clements developed a number of influential aspects of the theory involving harmonic processes, especially vowel harmony and nasal harmony, and John McCarthy generalized the theory to deal with the conjugational system of classical Arabic, on the basis of an autosegmental account of vowel and consonant slots on a central timing tier (see also nonconcatenative morphology).

== Structure of autosegmental rules ==
The autosegmental formalism departs from the depiction of segments as matrices of features in order to show segments as connected groups of individual features. Segments are depicted through vertical listings of features connected by lines. These sets can also underspecify in order to indicate a class rather than a single segment. Environments can be shown by placing other connected sets of features around that which is the focus of the rule. Feature changes are shown by striking through the lines that connect a feature that is lost to the rest of the segment and drawing dotted lines to features that are gained.

Voiced coronal stops

=== Distinctive features ===
Rather than classify segments using the categories given in the International Phonetic Alphabet, the autosegmental formalism makes use of distinctive features, which provide greater granularity and make identification of natural classes easier. A segment is identified by a +/− dichotomy of a series of binary features, some of which are subfeatures of unary features (place of articulation, in particular, is identified by unary features indicating the active articulator, and binary subfeatures that distinguish further). For example, [p], the voiceless bilabial stop, is indicated [−sonorant, −continuant, −voice, labial], and the set of voiced coronal stops can be indicated [−sonorant, −continuant, +voice, coronal].

An alveolar segment using dependent features.

==== Feature dependencies ====
For unary features to be fully specified, it is necessary to include binary subfeatures that correspond to them. In the autosegmental formalism, this is depicted by placing the binary subfeature at a horizontal offset from the unary feature and connecting them with a line. The next top-level feature in the segment would then be connected to the unary feature as well as opposed to the tone.

=== Functional groupings ===
There are situations in which the rule applies not to a particular value of a feature, but to whatever value the feature has. In these situations, it is necessary to include the presence of the feature, but not to specify its value. This can be done by including a placeholder feature composed of ellipses, with an indication of the type of feature. For example, a generic place feature can be indicated [...]_{P}.

== Tiers ==
The autosegmental formalism deals with several separate linear sequences; because of this, a phonological representation is depicted on several distinct tiers. Each of these tiers shows a different language feature.

=== Segmental tier ===
The autosegmental tier (also "skeletal tier") contains the features that define the segments articulated in the phonological representation. The descriptions given in the previous section deal with the segmental tier. In the segmental tier, features are assigned to segments.

=== Timing tier ===
The timing tier contains timing units that define the lengths of segments in the phonological representation. These timing units are commonly depicted as X's, and are assigned to segments.

=== Stress tier ===
The stress tier contains the features that show the distribution of stress in the phonological representation. The features in the stress tier are [+/– stress] and [+/– main], and they are assigned to the stress-bearing units of the language (syllables or moras).

=== Tone tier ===
The tone tier contains the features that show the distribution of tones in the phonological representation. The features in the tone tier are [+/– high pitch] and [+/– low pitch], and they are assigned to the tone-bearing units of the language (syllables or moras).

== Well-Formedness Condition ==
As a theory of the dynamic of phonological representations, autosegmental phonology includes a Well-formedness Condition on association lines (each element on one tier that "may" be associated to an element on another tier "must" be associated to such an element, and association lines do not cross) plus an instruction as to what to do in case of a violation of the Well-formedness Condition: add or delete the minimum number of association lines in order to maximally satisfy it. Many of the most interesting predictions of the autosegmental model derive from the automatic effects of the Well-formedness Condition and their independence of language-particular rules.

== Examples ==
Place assimilation in nasals

=== Place assimilation in nasals ===
The autosegmental formalism can be especially useful in describing assimilation rules. Using it for such rules makes the relationship between the result of the rule and the environment obvious. It also makes it possible to concisely describe rules that apply to different environments in different ways.

The phenomenon whereby /ɪn/ goes to [ɪn] in such words as <intractable> and <indestructible>, [ɪŋ] in such words as <ingrate> and <incapacitate>, and [ɪm] in such words as <impossible> and <implausible> can be represented in the autosegmental formalism. The rule is that a coronal nasal will assimilate to the place of the following consonant. The nasal is depicted by [+nasal] connected to a [coronal]_{P}, and the consonant is depicted to the nasal's right as [...]_{P}. No more specification is necessary because place is the only feature of the following segment that factors into the rule. The assimilation is shown by striking through the line to [coronal]_{P} on the left and drawing a dotted line to the [...]_{P} on the right.

== Bibliography ==
- Bloch, Bernard, 1948. A set of postulates for phonemic analysis. Language 24.
- Clements, G. N. 1976. Vowel harmony in nonlinear generative phonology: an autosegmental model. Indiana University Linguistics Club.
- Goldsmith, John. 1990. Autosegmental and metrical phonology. Basil Blackwell.
- Hayes, B. 2009. Introductory Phonology. Malden: Blackwell, ch. 14-15.
- Hockett, Charles. 1955. A manual of phonology. Indiana University Publications in Anthropology and Linguistics 11.
- McCarthy, John. 1981. A prosodic theory of non-concatenative morphology. Linguistic Inquiry 12(3): 373-418. http://works.bepress.com/john_j_mccarthy/8/
- Ogden, R. and Local, J. K., 1994 Disentangling Autosegments from Prosodies: A Note on the Misrepresentation of a Research Tradition in Phonology. ERIC EJ501527
- Roca, I. and Johnson, W. 1999. A course in phonology. Wiley-Blackwell, pp. 99–111.
