= John Goldsmith (footballer) =

Australian rules footballer

Personal information
- Full name: John Goldsmith
- Born: 17 June 1931
- Original team: Hamilton Imperials
- Height: 180 cm (5 ft 11 in)
- Weight: 77 kg (170 lb)

Playing career^{1}
Years	Club	Games (Goals)
1956	Geelong	6 (0)
- ^{1} Playing statistics correct to the end of 1956.

John Goldsmith (born 17 June 1931) is a former Australian rules footballer who played with Geelong in the Victorian Football League (VFL).
