= Nick Clements =

American linguist (1940–2009)

George Nickerson Clements (October 5, 1940 – August 30, 2009) was an American linguist specializing in phonology.

== Career ==
Clements was born in Cincinnati, Ohio, and educated in New Haven, Paris and London. He received his Ph.D. from the School of Oriental and African Studies, University of London, in 1973, defending a thesis on the Ewe language based on a year of field work in Ghana. He was a visiting scientist at M.I.T. (1973–75) and held appointments as professor at Harvard (1975–82) and Cornell (1982–91) before moving to the Centre National de la Recherche Scientifique (C.N.R.S.) in Paris in 1992.

Clements' main research was in phonology with a special focus on African languages. He is best known for his research in syllable theory, tone and feature theory which have contributed to the modern theory of sound patterning in spoken language. At the time of his death, his work was concerned with the principles underlying speech sound inventories across languages (Clements & Ridouane 2011).

== Personal ==
He was married to French linguist Annie Rialland. He died of cancer in Chatham, Massachusetts, at the age of 68.

== Books ==
- Clements, G. N. & S. J. Keyser, 1983. CV Phonology: a Generative Theory of the Syllable (Linguistic Inquiry Monograph 9), MIT Press, Cambridge, Ma.
- Halle, Morris & G. N. Clements, 1983. Problem Book in Phonology. Cambridge, Ma.: MIT Press and Bradford Books.
- Clements, G. N. & J. Goldsmith, eds., 1984. Autosegmental Studies in Bantu Tone. Berlin: Mouton de Gruyter
- Clements, G. N. & R. Ridouane, eds., 2011. Where do phonological features come from? Cognitive, physical and developmental bases of distinctive speech categories. John Benjamins Publishing Company: Amsterdam.

== Other selected publications ==
- Clements, G. N., 1985. "The Geometry of Phonological Features," Phonology Yearbook 2, 225-252
- Clements, G. N., 1990. "The Role of the Sonority Cycle in Core Syllabification." In John Kingston & M. Beckman, eds., Papers in Laboratory Phonology I, Cambridge: Cambridge University Press, Cambridge, MA, pp. 283–333
- Clements, G. N. & Elizabeth Hume, 1995. "The Internal Organization of Speech Sounds" In John Goldsmith, ed., Handbook of Phonological Theory. Oxford: Basil Blackwell, Oxford, pp. 245–306
- Clements, G. N., 2003. "Feature Economy in Sound Systems", Phonology 20.3, pp. 287–333
- Clements, G. N. & Annie Rialland, 2008. "Africa as a phonological area". In Bernd Heine & Derek Nurse, eds, A Linguistic Geography of Africa. Cambridge: Cambridge University Press, pp. 36–85.
