= John Goldsmith (linguist) =

American linguist (born 1951)

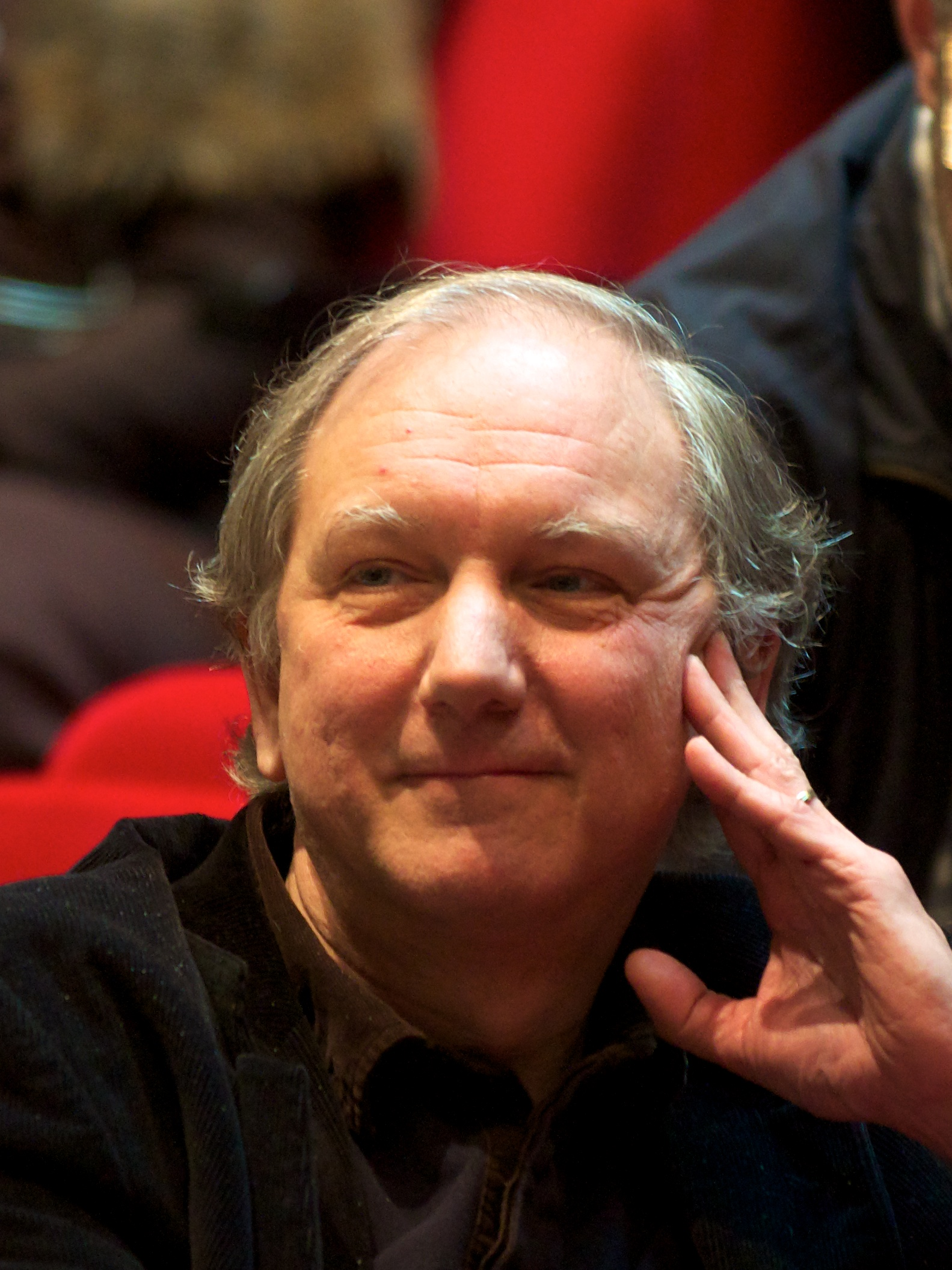
- Born: 1951 (age 74–75)
- Education: Swarthmore College (BA); Massachusetts Institute of Technology (PhD)
- Awards: Fellow of the AAAS
- Scientific career
- Fields: Phonology, Generative grammar
- Workplaces: University of Chicago, Indiana University
- Doctoral advisor: Morris Halle

John Anton Goldsmith (born 1951) is an American linguist. He is the Edward Carson Waller Distinguished Service Professor at the University of Chicago, with appointments in linguistics and computer science.

== Biography ==
Goldsmith obtained his B.A. at Swarthmore College in 1972, and completed his PhD in linguistics at the Massachusetts Institute of Technology (MIT) in 1976, under the linguist Morris Halle. He was on the faculty of the Department of Linguistics at Indiana University before joining the University of Chicago in 1984. He has taught at the LSA Linguistic Institutes and has held visiting appointments at many universities, such as McGill, Harvard, and UCSD. In 2007, Goldsmith was elected as a Fellow of the American Academy of Arts and Sciences.

== Research ==
Goldsmith's research ranges from phonology to computational linguistics. His PhD thesis introduced autosegmental phonology; the idea that phonological phenomena is a collection of parallel tiers with individual segments, each representing certain features of speech. His more recent research focuses on unsupervised learning of linguistic structure (as demonstrated by the Linguistica project, a body of software that tries to automatically analyze the morphology of a language), as well as extending computational linguistics algorithms to bioinformatics.

== Books ==
- John A Goldsmith, Bernard Laks, Battle in the Mind Fields, University of Chicago Press, 2018
