= Contemporary commercial music =

Term referring to non-classical music

Contemporary commercial music or CCM is a term used by some vocal pedagogists in the United States to refer to non-classical music. This term encompasses jazz, pop, blues, soul, country, folk, and rock styles.

== The emergence of contemporary commercial music (CCM) ==
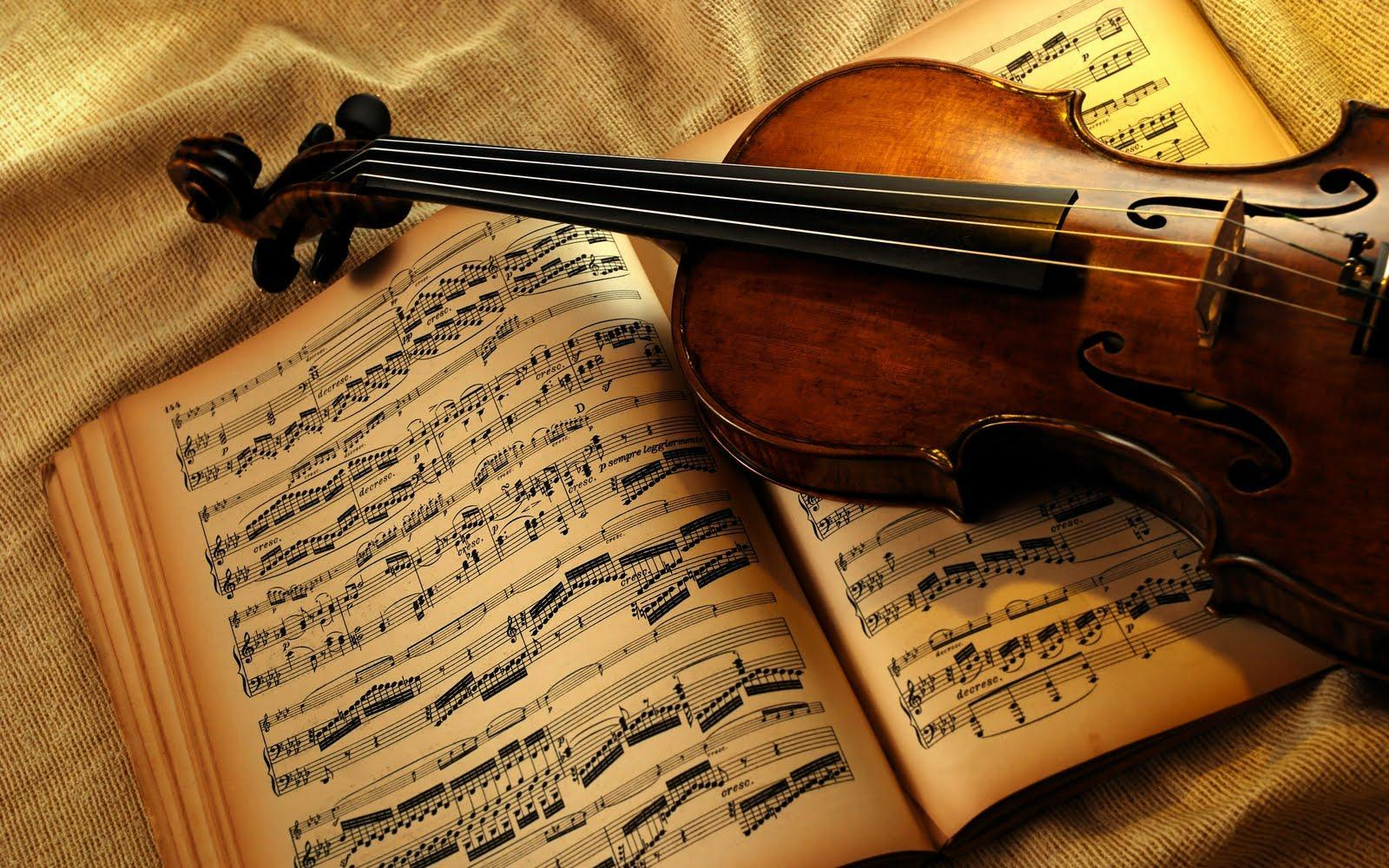
A classic score and violin

Pioneered by Jeannette LoVetri, the phenomenon of contemporary commercial music (CCM) was developed to assess and combine all the prevailing forms of CCM to distinguish the latter from classical music. LoVetri asserts that despite CCM being used to refer to classical music in modern times, in Europe, it also points to any music style considered "current". This points to the several uses of the term commercial music which also alludes to technology in music, hence the wide acceptance of the term CCM in the US.

In this context, CCM is the new terminology used to refer to non-classical music. More specifically, CCM is a generic phrase developed to comprise several aspects of the music industry including experimental music, folk, country, rap, hip-hop, soul, R&B, gospel, rock, pop, and the music theatre, besides all other styles that are considered contemporary.

== Comparison of CCM with classical music forms ==
It is notable that CCM is inclusive of all music recorded and stored in digital format before it is uploaded on the internet. Differing from conventional compact disc records, CCM constitutes several unique aspects including easy production, storage, and dissemination into the market. Particularly, it began to develop with the advancement in internet technology in the mid-1990s before officially entering the mobile era beyond 2010.

In the case of classical music, the storage and dissemination of music gradually evolved from the traditional vinyl records to more portable formats including compact disk records and tapes. Portillo et al. note that the traditional music storage later evolved into non-physical digital formats attributed to the widespread use of the internet resulting in a substantially improved "dissemination effect" hence increased music popularisation. CCM earns huge returns each year from singers across the globe.

The larger majority of artists who earn do so through focusing on one of the mentioned CCM styles, instead of classical music. Several individuals listen via various media outlets. However, in the scientific and academic contexts, CCM is not sufficiently accounted for. Traditionally, music was performed by aristocrats, in royalty courts, and in churches. For instance, the upper-class was characterised by wealthy patrons who supported both the singers and composers, and there was a high demand for music by the churches to fulfil their liturgical needs.

The creation of this music was made possible by trained singers and musicians who performed before elite audiences for almost two centuries before being availed for consumption by the public. On the contrary CCM refers to the "people's music", and has since been held as such. As much as American music dates back to the 19th century, the same is true for country music. This music stemmed from simple individuals who composed and performed their own music, usually without being subjected to any formal training.

== CCM styles and vocal production ==
Apparently, no substantial research has been conducted in light of any style of the CCM. However, studies have focused on the Broadway belting style attributed to its minimal association with the classical production of voices. Since belting is a key vocal quality in several of the CCM styles, it should be subjected to further investigations before a clearer image of this form of music may be defined. It is interesting to imagine that scientific research will now be centered on the investigation of belting besides other techniques of singing presented in several other styles.

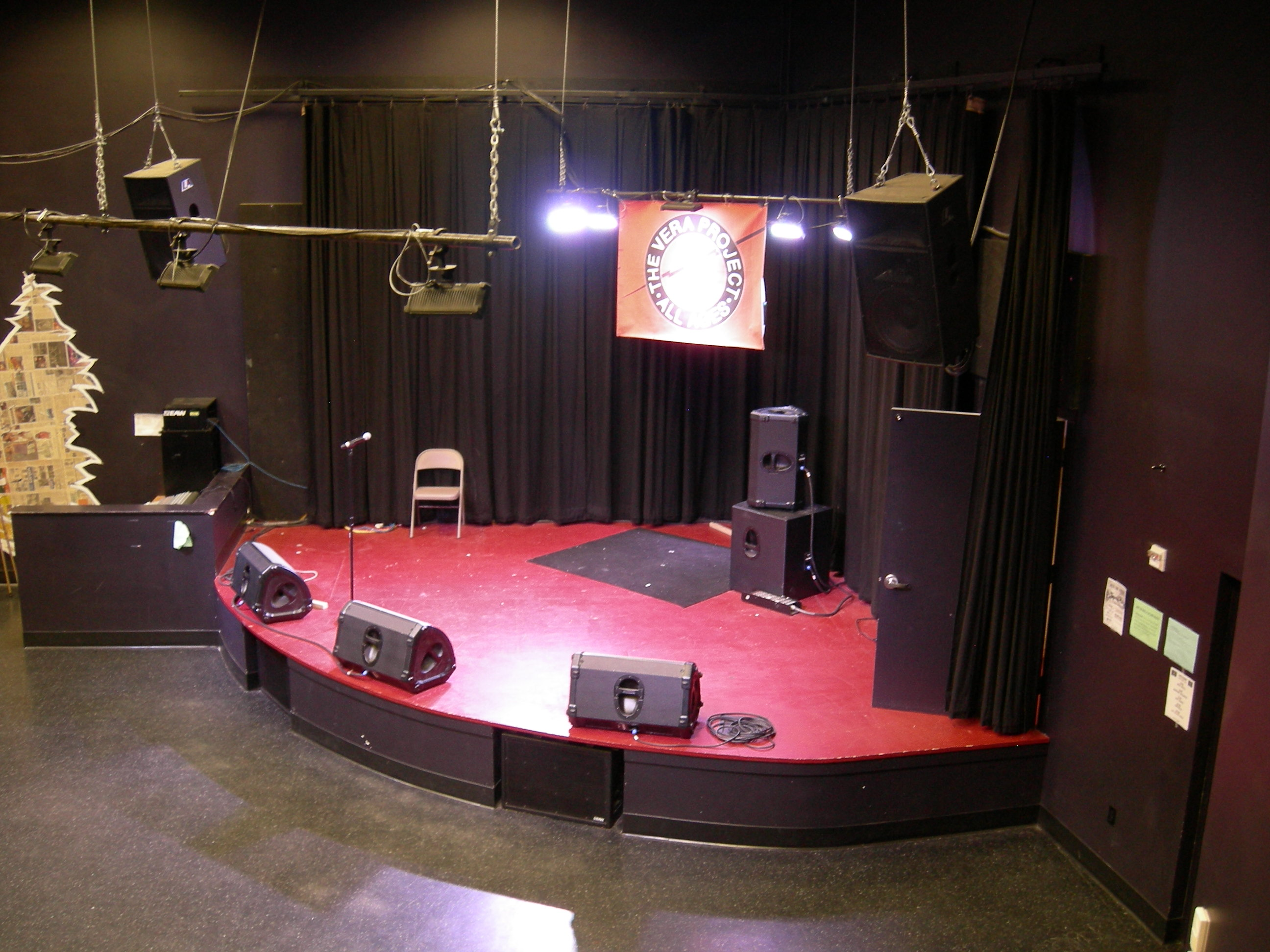
The image illustrates of the classic music transmission of the small stage including monitors, speakers, and microphones.

All the styles constituted in CCM are a product of the colloquial speech evolution, and are all subjected to electronic amplification. Therefore, vocal production in CCM is considered in tandem with amplification. For instance, the sound engineer, soundboards, monitors, speakers, and microphones affect the information received by the singer, and consequently their action. This implies that the perception and auditory function of the singer must be directly assessed relatively to the production of voices.

If this is not done, it may result in the production of invalid inferences and skewed models. However, the music theatre is an obvious exception, since the singers generally tend to employ microphones but perform as if they were absent since no monitors are usually placed in front of them. Therefore, it is essential to investigate the nature and dynamics of every single CCM style, hence the importance of research in clarifying their individual similarities and their variations with the classical technique of singing.

== The influence of CCM on singers and audience ==
For several years, it is assumed that classical vocal pedagogy is enough to satisfy each vocal need, irrespective of the style employed. Such a mentality has compelled several singers who may have acquired vocal training to ignore it, thereby fostering the ideology that CCM artists exhibit less seriousness regarding their professionalism as vocalists since they avoid the notion of vocal training. Utterly, this is a misinformed opinion. Nevertheless, the CCM artists who have opted to take vocal training lessons have consistently and independently tried to practically employ the lessons they have received.

This is because a larger section of vocal training is still guided by the strict norms of the classical music style. CCM is largely misinterpreted since it has been neglected or ignored. This way, other classical artists are unable to differentiate the phenomena of vocal production and musical style, since classical singers perceive them as being virtually similar. These artists tend to build an incorrect assumption that the performance of CCM repertoire simply encompasses a change of style.

However, the audiences can deduce if opera singers perform CCM based on the operatic sound, usually even in scenarios where the artist does not intend to use the operatic sound. Similarly, this is applicable to a section of CCM singers who attempted to make and record classical compositions since non-may be considered successful both in the context of sales or critically.

Overall, it is appropriate to conclude that a style's standards and its requisite vocal aspects are implemented and maintained by the audiences, and individuals with a complete professional career, especially in the contextual style. These standards neither established by academics nor stars who have shifted between unrelated styles. For instance, they tend to change gradually since they are significantly impacted by the creative exploration of the artists and the changing popular fan tastes within the marketplace for music consumption.

== "Contemporary" and "Commercial" ==
The phrase "Contemporary," within the US, mostly points to the classical music of the twentieth and the current century. However, within Europe, it may refer to either classical music or not. Similarly, "commercial" music may exhibit ambiguity in meaning as well. It may refer to technology or business of music, or may imply music for radio or TV commercial, hence may be challenging to understand if used alone. However, in tandem, both phrases lacked further association, and the employment of CCM as being generally equivalent to "classical" is considered successful in both regions and abroad. It has provided the platform for both styled to improve in credibility besides the validation of the individuals who teach them in search of established and new techniques.

In the singing context, a contentious conflict exists between the teachers and the choral directors. However, contemporary practices, trends, and preferences have triggered a new and controversial debate. For instance, the rapid rise in popular styles of music, voice teachers and choral conductors, should address the practice of period performance while negotiating the vocal prerequisites of multi-ethnic literature, show choir/jazz, and musical theatre.

== CCM and singing-voice pedagogy ==
Places of articulation. More details in voice pedagogy.

For a long time, it has been presumed that the classical voice techniques associated with the western culture could thoroughly and adequately meet the various demands in the music industry. However, based on scientific evidence, other voice pedagogues currently assert that the practical requirements of the contemporary form of music are not similar to the classical function. Non-classical music is largely flourishing within the general culture.

Popular styles of singing have become a common coin for this century's professional expectations and a larger part of the previous century. However, it is only recently that some higher education programs started to acknowledge styles alongside their relevant techniques that are found beyond the pillar of Western art song and classical operatic literature. This way, CCM is still considered an emerging field in voice pedagogy.

Several highly publicized resources and seminars focused on CCM have developed in tandem with the rise in demands for training in contemporary commercial music, particularly beyond formal academic settings. Among the most proclaimed techniques which have received large acceptance within academic fields, is the "Somatic Voicework™ The LoVetri Method". The singing techniques for genres including rock, pop, jazz, blues, gospel, and folk, which are categorised under the new heading termed as CCM, are not yet comprehensively addressed nor clearly defined in conventional texts of voice pedagogy. While it holds that all singers are poised to articulate, resonate, phonate, and breathe, they tend to approach such technical aspects rather differently.

== Scientific perspective of contemporary commercial music ==
Currently, enough scientific evidence exists towards stating the experience with the CCM's vocal mechanism and the reason for the possibility of learning to sing effectively and in a healthy way, without losing the capacity to sing classical music. Despite that, no individual has had a successful career which balances the classical music and the CCM realms simultaneously, it is appropriate to assert that this might be experienced in the future.

Research reveals the presence of several approaches towards the creation of a particular vocal target. One can create tonal or vowel qualities of sound via maneuvering the jaw, lips, tongue, velum, pharyngeal walls, laryngeal position, vocal folds, rib cage and abdomen. Due to the presence of several possibilities, one may expect to locate all singing techniques that reflect them.

Each of the mentioned types of singing needs different configurations of the filter and the source, different articulator activities, and use of breath. In turn, varied musical and vocal goals need more than a single way to complement the vocal folds, throat, and mouth to the abdomen and lungs. Issues related to the possibility that such professional pre-requisites are artistic, healthy or optimal must be investigated separately and in-depth.

Despite the increasing data volumes and the resilient professional integration of CCM approaches, the inclusion of CCM methods within applied voice education remains a contentious topic among several musicians. This is partly manifested based on the misconception that the CCM approach to singing is basically unhealthy, and may prove injurious even to a serious professional.

== Transition of popular singing into CCM ==
In 1966, the American Academy of Teachers of Singing (AATS) released a statement that revealed the opinions presented during the middle period of the 20th century. Particularly, it focuses on the phenomenon of "popular singing". The latter has changed significantly within the last 25 years. During the 1820s, classical singers who were proficiently trained were distinguished among the renowned artists of that time. In the 1830s, the field grew to entail the classical singers and the traditional folk and emerging radio artists. Although uninspiring by contemporary standards, their repertoire was subjected to public criticism by the clergy due to suggestive lyrics. Their approach to singing was also questioned by music educators and teacher organisations.

Over the last few years, the remarkable growth of communication platforms besides the commercial botching of the public taste via mass media have yielded emerging and adverse challenges to the teacher of music. For instance, the Nielsen report of 2020 reveals that 1.15 trillion songs were streamed on demand in 2019. Apparently, no one can refute the cultural advantages gained from cinema, television, recordings, and radio, but the impact of such media in shaping behaviour and preferences has similarly had a negative effect. Thus, these influences must be taken into account by all individuals who may be indirectly or directly concerned with performing arts education besides the ultimate qualities of aesthetic experience.

Generally, due to cross-cultural exchanges, technological advancements along with the popular western music culture, CCM is no longer exclusive to countries such as the UK and the USA where this form originated but has infiltrated other continents including Europe and Asia. This way CCM continues to dominate the global market in the 21st century.

== See also ==
- Voice classification in non-classical music
- Contemporary art
- Contemporary classical music
- Music education
