= Palatography =

Visual method to examine the human voice

Palatography is a technique used to identify which parts of the mouth are used when making different sounds. This technique is often used by linguists doing field work on little-known natural languages. A record made through palatography is called a palatogram.

It involves painting a coloring agent, such as a dye or a mixture of charcoal and olive oil on the tongue or the roof of a person's mouth and having that person pronounce a specific sound. A photograph is then made of the mouth roof and tongue in order to determine how the sound was articulated.

The technique can also be performed electronically (electropalatography) using a tool called a pseudo-palate, which consists of a retainer-like plate lined with electrodes that is placed on the roof of the mouth while the speaker pronounces a sound.

== See also ==
- Articulatory phonetics
