= Aerometer =

Instrument designed to measure the density

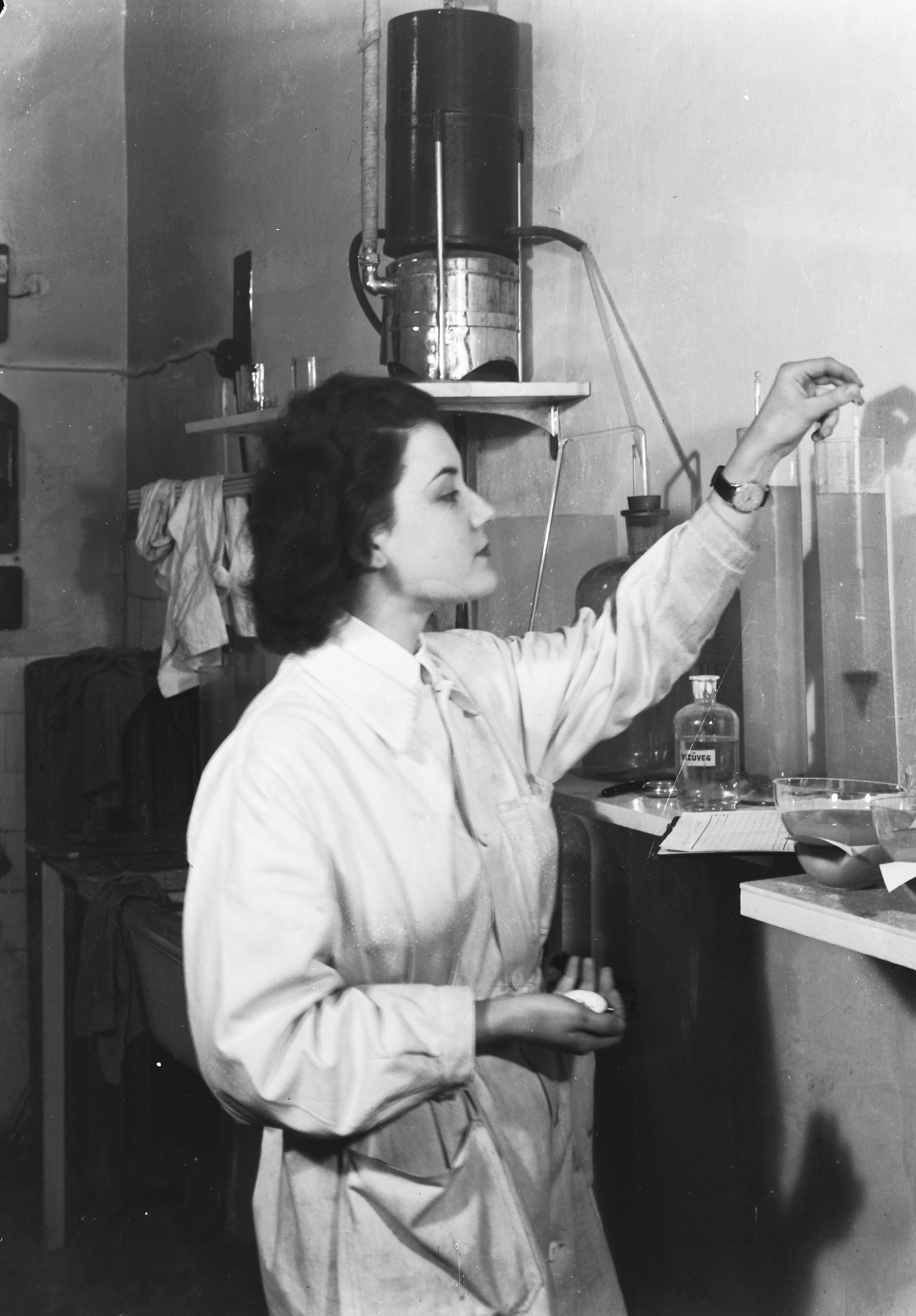
Using an aeromerer

An aerometer is an instrument designed to measure the density (among other parameters) of the air and some gases.

The word aerometer (or Ärometer, from Ancient Greek ἀήρ -aer "air" and μέτρον -métron "measure, scale") refers to various types of devices for measuring or handling of gases. The instruments designated with this name can be used to find: the density, the flow, the amount or some other parameter of the air or a determined gas.

Several different designs of aerometer have been developed for the study of speech. These make use of a mask fitting closely to the speaker's face, usually with a partition separating airflow from the nose from airflow from the mouth. Various designs of transducer convert the flow of air into electrical signals.

Another instrument called areometer (from Ancient Greek ἀραιός -araiós "lightness" and μέτρον -métron "measure, scale"), also known as hydrometer, used for measuring liquids density, is often confused with the term aerometer here defined.

== Types of aerometers ==
- Hall aerometer.
- Hutchinson aerometer.
- Struve aerometer.
- Scheurer aerometer.
- Smith aerometer.
- Frøkjær-Jensen aerometer.
