= Ultrasound tongue imaging =

Technique in medical research

Ultrasound tongue imaging (UTI) uses ultrasound to form images of tongues. It has been used for speech production and linguistics research since it came into regular clinical use in the 1960s and 1970s.

== Technique ==
It is a non-invasive technique that allows researchers to view the shape, position and movements of the tongue (from root to apex) in real time during speech.

== History ==
UTI became popular in phonetics laboratories as ultrasound units became more portable and affordable. The Ultrafest conference assembles researchers who employ UTI. Locations have included University of Potsdam (2017), University of Hong Kong (2015), Queen Margaret University (2013), Haskins Laboratories (2010 and 2002), New York University (2007), University of Arizona (2005), University of British Columbia (2004).

== Applications ==
Uses of UTI include:

- phonetics research
- speech-language pathology /therapy
- second language acquisition
- phonetics and speech and language therapy/pathology training
