= Electropalatography =

Technique to measure articulation in phonetics

Electropalatography (EPG) is a technique used to monitor contacts between the tongue and hard palate, particularly during articulation and speech.

A custom-made artificial palate is moulded to fit against a speaker's hard palate. The artificial palate contains electrodes exposed to the lingual surface. When contact occurs between the tongue surface and any of the electrodes, particularly between the lateral margins of the tongue and the borders of the hard palate, electronic signals are sent to an external processing unit. EPG provides dynamic real-time visual feedback of the location and timing of tongue contacts with the hard palate.

The details of tongue activity during speech are recorded, providing direct articulatory information that a person can use in therapy to monitor and improve their articulation patterns. Visual feedback is very important in the success of treating deaf children.

== History ==
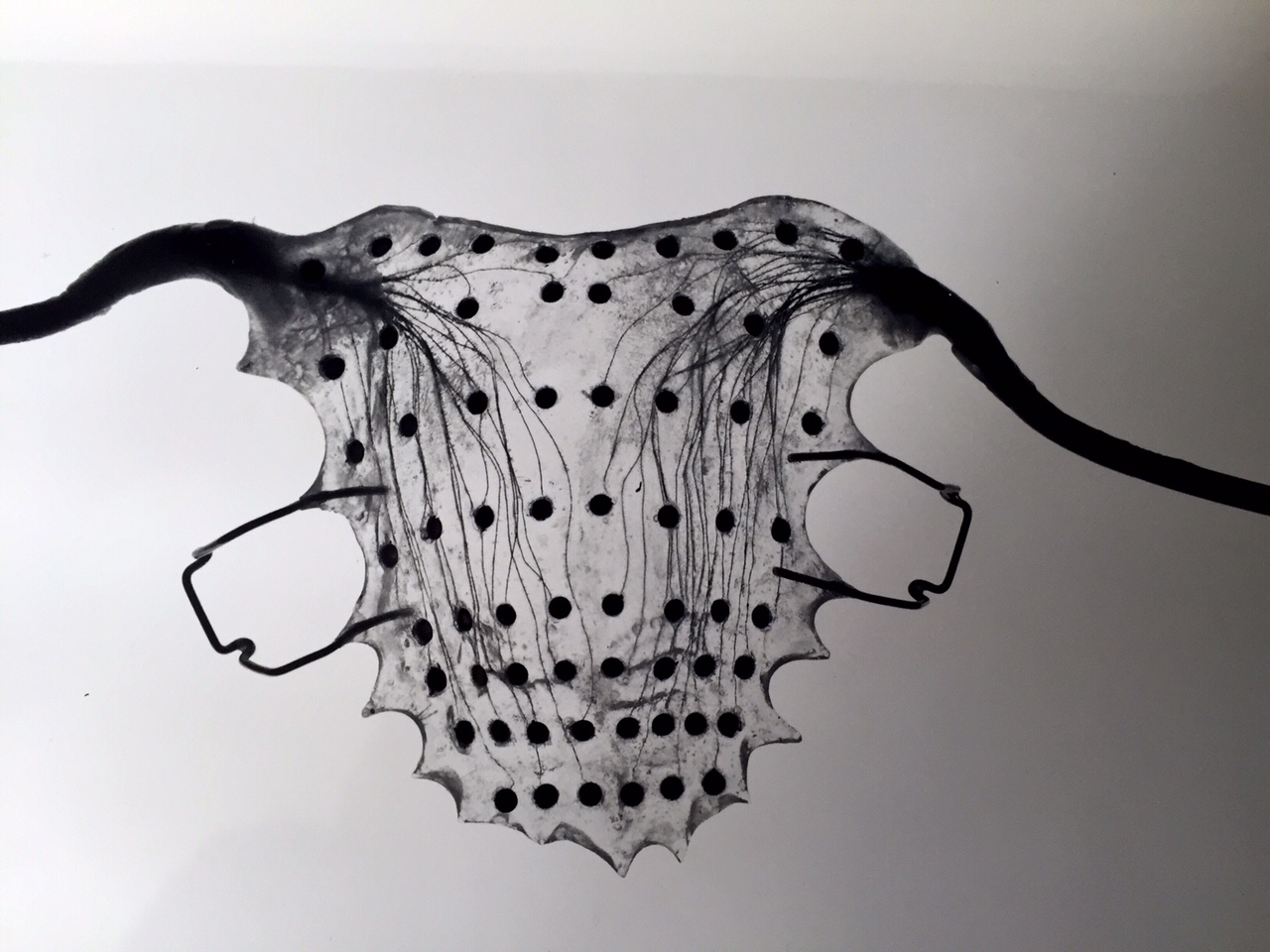
Fig.1 An electropalate

Electropalatography was originally conceptualized and developed as a tool for phonetics research to improve upon traditional palatography methods. Both military and academic language researchers used early electropalatography tools to obtain accurate information regarding tongue-to-palate contact in a number of foreign languages.

Early EPG devices used direct current electricity to power the sensors, which were activated by moisture sensors on mouthpieces. Mouthpieces (electropalates) originally closely resembled modern dental impression plates. Mouthpieces became more customized over time, which allowed for more accurate research. Fig. 1 shows a typical electropalate from the Reading system.

EPG added significant insight into academic understanding of articulatory phonetics. In the 1960s and 1970s a number of independent individuals and companies recognized EPG's potential for pedagogical and therapeutic applications. Despite the multiple attempts to reverse engineer EPG tools for speech therapy, most companies failed to commercialize EPG effectively. EPG tools remain fairly expensive tools for speech therapy and phonetics research, though the information they provide are difficult to obtain using other methods of visual feedback of articulation.

== In phonetic research ==
Although much of the development of EPG has been dedicated to clinical applications, it has been used in a number of laboratory phonetic investigations. Stone (1997) lists three main areas of research:

- study of the physiology of consonant articulations involving lingual-palatal contact
- study of the size and shape of oral constrictions in the production of fricative consonants
- the effect of neighbouring vowels on consonants production (coarticulation)

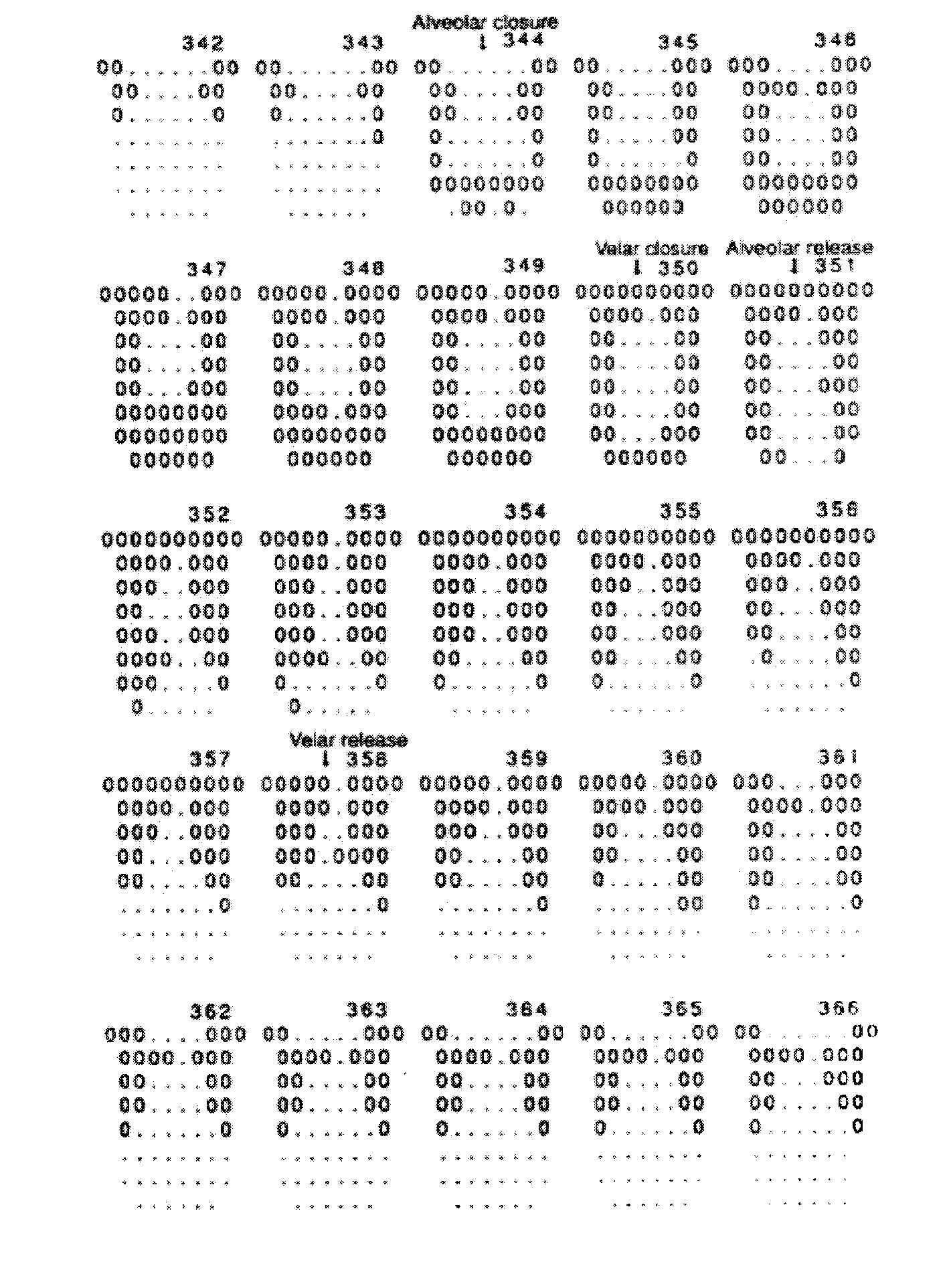
Fig.2 Electropalatography printout

When electropalatography is used for speech research, the data from tongue-palate contact is sampled by the controlling computer at up to 100 frames per second. In the early days (when digital displays were less ubiquitous and more limited), the data was printed out on paper for analysis. An example of the printout can be seen in Fig.2, where the sequence runs from top to bottom, and where the 'O' symbol indicates contact and '.' indicates no contact. The utterance shown is 'catkin' /kæt.kɪn/; the sample numbered 344 shows when the /t/ closure is complete, and at frame 350 there is a complete velar closure. The alveolar closure is released at 351. The articulatory overlap (which is inaudible) is thus clearly shown. Individual frames of EPG contact data may be used to illustrate descriptions of consonant articulations, and this is done by Cruttenden for all the English (RP) consonants. In some research, multiple repetitions may be summed to produce graphical representations of tongue-palate contact in a way that minimizes effects of random variation on single tokens. This was done by Farnetani in studies of Italian and French coarticulation.

== Providers ==
Three primary manufacturers of EPG tools exist: CompleteSpeech in the United States, Articulate Instruments, and icSpeech in Great Britain. Completespeech is a private company that specializes in speech therapy oriented EPG tools, branded as The SmartPalate System. The SmartPalate System uses a standard size sensor sheet with 126 sensors that is fitted to individual mouthpiece molds. Articulate Instruments provides both speech therapy and research oriented EPG mouthpieces, branded as The Reading Palate and The Articulate Palate. Articulate Instrument EPG sensors are places by hand for individual users' mouthpieces. The icSpeech, branded as LinguaGraph, also uses the Reading Palate.

== In therapy ==
Electropalatography has been studied in a variety of populations, including children with cleft palate, children with Down syndrome, children who are deaf, children with cochlear implants, children with cerebral palsy and adults with Parkinson's disease. Therapy has proved to be successful in tested populations. Longitudinal studies with large sample sizes are needed to determine the long-term success of therapy.
