= Electroglottograph =

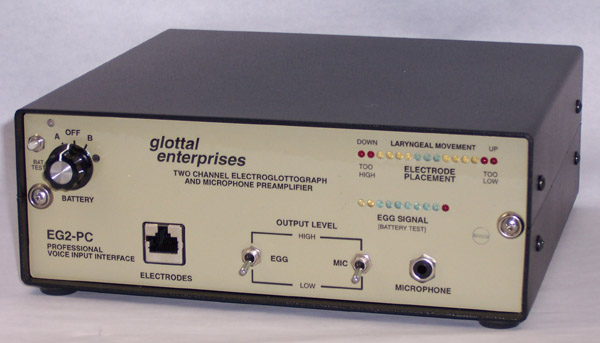
Electroglottograph, Glottal Enterprises model EG2-PCX shown here.

The electroglottograph, or EGG, (also referred to as a laryngograph) is a device used for the noninvasive measurement of the degree of contact between the vibrating vocal folds during voice production. Though it is difficult to verify the assumption precisely, the aspect of contact being measured by a typical EGG unit is considered to be the vocal fold contact area (VFCA). To measure VFCA, electrodes are applied on the surface of the neck so that the EGG records variations in the transverse electrical impedance of the larynx and nearby tissues by means of a small A/C electric current (in megaHertz). This electrical impedance will vary slightly with the area of contact between the moist vocal folds during the segment of the glottal vibratory cycle in which the folds are in contact. However, because the percentage variation in the neck impedance caused by vocal fold contact can be extremely small and varies considerably between subjects, no absolute measure of contact area is obtained, only the pattern of variation for a given subject.

Early commercial available EGG units were compared quite thoroughly by Baken. However, using modern low noise electronics, EGG noise levels can be brought down enough so that the noise is approximately 40 dB, a factor of 100 less than a typical EGG signal from an adult voice.

In addition, by using multiple channels simultaneously, the technique can be made easier to use and more reliable by giving the user an indication of the correct positioning of the electrodes, and providing a quantitative measure of vertical movements of the larynx during voice production.

Electroglottograph signals have also been used in stroboscope synchronization, voice fundamental frequency tracking, tracking vocal fold abductory movements and the study of the singing voice.

Electroglottographic wavegrams are a new technique for displaying and analyzing EGG signals. This technique provides an intuitive means for quickly assessing vocal fold contact phenomena and their variation over time.

== History ==
Electroglottographs were first invented by Philippe Fabre in 1957. In the next year, Rolf Timcke "assigned phases of the glottal cycle to the EGG curve". Børge Frøkjær-Jensen showed in 1969 that EGGs allow for better depiction of vocal fold movement than other contemporary measures.

At first, it was assumed that EGGs measured the opening of the glottis. In the 1980s and 90s, EGGs received a significant burst of attention, and understanding of them widened. It was then that the EGG was understood the measurement of the mid-sagittal contact area of the vocal folds (often simplified as VCFA). For instance, a 1988 research paper by Scherer et al. showed that VCFA and EGG voltage values were strongly correlated.

Today, EGGs are sold by a number of companies, including Synchrovoice, F-J Electronics, Glottal Enterprises, and VoceVista. According to VoceVista's website, an EGG costs $850.

== Function ==
The contacts on the electrodes from a Glottal Enterprises EG2-PCX.

Electroglottographs have 2-4 copper electrodes that coated with a thin layer of gel and are held tight to the larynx with a velcro collar. Ideally, these electrodes should touch the outside of the thyroid cartilage. Even a small error in placement can cause incorrect output from the EGG.

After set-up, a high-frequency low-amplitude electric current, typically around 0.5 V and with a sound wave between 300 kHz and 5 MHz, travels between the electrodes, passing through the throat of the speaker. Participants cannot feel the electric current. The electrode that is receiving the current sees a slightly different current than the one emitted; this difference informs the EGG about the tissue impedance in the throat, allowing it to provide the researcher with information.

Since the EGG does not measure sound, but impedance, the machine is not affected by background noise or noisy environments.

=== Simultaneous use with other devices ===
One drawback of EGGs is that they do not track any spatial information about the shape of the VCFA. Vocal fold vibration is typically characterized as taking place over three dimensions, and, thus, EGGs cannot capture all relevant information on their own. For example, researchers have proposed using EGGs simultaneously with MRIs of the lungs or 3-D electromagnetic articulography, in order to rectify some of these issues.

Photograph of an EGG signal from a Glottal Enterprises EG2-PC (top) and a Laryngograph/Kay electroglottograph (bottom).

=== Interpretation ===
EGGs output a waveform that corresponds to the VCFA. Generally put, the upward peak of the waveform corresponds to closing folds and the downward slope corresponds to opening folds. A wider pulse corresponds to increased adduction of the vocal folds.

The results can be influenced from a variety of factors, including the placement of the electrodes, shift in posture of the speaker, or simply neck size. It has been shown that is harder to get high quality EGG waveforms from women and children due to their vocal folds having a smaller size and their thyroid cartilage having a wider angle.

== Applications ==
Electroglottographs are particularly useful due to their non-invasiveness and low cost; before their invention, people interested in the vocal folds would have had to perform more invasive procedures like endoscopies or videokymographies. The output of an EGG can provide a researcher information about the voice's fundamental frequency, vocal fold abduction, and laryngeal height.

=== Medical applications ===
Figure 7 of: Martin Rothenberg and James J. Mashie, Monitoring Vocal Fold Abduction Through Vocal Fold Contact Area Journal of Speech and Hearing Research, Volume 31, 338–351, September 1988

EGGs can be used to aid medical providers when providing behavioral treatment or diagnosis to people with voice disorders. The subtypes of dysphonia, more commonly known as a hoarse voice, can be identified using EGGs, for example. EGGs can also be used to identify maximum laryngeal displacement and the duration of movement during swallowing. This feedback can aid clinicians who teach swallowing techniques like the Mendelsohn maneuver to patients with dysphagia.

In recent years, EGGs have also been used for vocal pedagogy, in order to give students biofeedback in real time. Through the same logic, EGGs are beginning to be used in voice therapy.

=== Linguistic research applications ===
EGGs can also be helpful to the field of acoustic phonetics, and more particularly, researchers who are interested in the laryngeal mechanism.
