= Ian Wilson =

Ian Wilson may refer to:

== In sports ==
- Ian Wilson (Irish cricketer) (1932–2013), Irish cricketer
- Ian Wilson (New Zealand cricketer) (born 1952), New Zealand cricketer
- Ian Wilson (footballer, born 1923) (1923–1989), Scottish football player
- Ian Wilson (footballer, born 1958), Scottish international football player
- Ian Wilson (rower) (born 1951), British lightweight rower
- Ian Wilson (soccer) (born 1960), American soccer player
- Ian Wilson (swimmer) (born 1970), British swimmer

== In music and film ==
- Ian Wilson (actor) (1901–1987), British actor
- Ian Wilson (cinematographer) (1939–2021), English cinematographer
- Ian Wilson (composer) (born 1964), Irish composer
- Ian Wilson (born 1987), drummer for the Scottish pirate metal band Alestorm
- Ian Wilson, vocalist for the American punk band The Star Spangles

== Other people ==
- Ian Wilson (priest) (1920–1988), Dean of Argyll and The Isles
- Ian Wilson (Australian politician) (1932–2013), Australian politician
- Ian Wilson (Vanuatuan politician), member of the Parliament of Vanuatu
- Ian Wilson (author) (born 1941), writer on Christianity, history, and science
- Ian E. Wilson (born 1943), chief Librarian and Archivist of Canada
- Ian Wilson (entrepreneur) (1943–2020), British entrepreneur and travel writer
- Ian Wilson (phonetician) (born 1966), Canadian professor
- Ian Wilson (biologist) (fl. 2000s), American microbiologist
- Ian Wilson, Grand Master of the Grand Orange Lodge of Scotland
- Ian Wilson, founder of Aurora Foods and Pinnacle Foods
