= Lilias Armstrong =

British phonetician (1882–1937)

- Portrait, unknown date
- Born: Lilias Eveline Armstrong; 29 September 1882; Pendlebury, Lancashire, England
- Died: 9 December 1937 (aged 55); North Finchley, Middlesex, England
- Other name: Lilias Eveline Boyanus
- Education: B.A., University of Leeds, 1906
- Occupation: Phonetician
- Employer(s): Phonetics Department, University College, University of London
- Works: Full list
- Spouse: Simon Boyanus (m. 1926)

Lilias Eveline Armstrong (29 September 1882 – 9 December 1937) was an English phonetician. She worked at University College London, where she attained the rank of reader. Armstrong is most known for her work on English intonation as well as the phonetics and tone of Somali and Kikuyu. Her book on English intonation, written with Ida C. Ward, was in print for 50 years. Armstrong also provided some of the first detailed descriptions of tone in Somali and Kikuyu.

Armstrong grew up in Northern England. She graduated from the University of Leeds, where she studied French and Latin. She taught French in an elementary school in the London suburbs for a while, but then joined the University College Phonetics Department, headed by Daniel Jones. Her most notable works were the 1926 book A Handbook of English Intonation, co-written with Ward, the 1934 paper "The Phonetic Structure of Somali", and the book The Phonetic and Tonal Structure of Kikuyu, published posthumously in 1940 after she died of a stroke in 1937 at age 55.

She was the subeditor of the International Phonetic Association's journal Le Maître Phonétique for more than a decade, and was praised in her day for her teaching, both during the academic term and in the department's summer vacation courses. Jones wrote in his obituary of her that she was "one of the finest phoneticians in the world".

== Early life ==
Lilias Eveline Armstrong was born on 29 September 1882 in Pendlebury, Lancashire, to James William Armstrong, a Free Methodist minister, and Mary Elizabeth Armstrong (née Hunter). Her upbringing led to her speech having certain Northern English characteristics. Armstrong studied French and Latin at the University of Leeds, where she was a king's scholar. She received her B.A. in 1906, and she was also trained as a teacher.

After graduating from Leeds, Armstrong taught French in East Ham for several years; she had success in this line of work, and was well on her way to becoming headmistress by the time she left this position in 1918. While she was Senior Assistant Mistress, she began studying phonetics in the evenings part-time at the University College Phonetics Department in order to improve her teaching of French pronunciation. In 1917, Armstrong received a Diploma with Distinction in French Phonetics; she got a Diploma with Distinction in English phonetics the following year.

== Academic career ==
=== Teaching and lecturing ===
==== Employment history ====
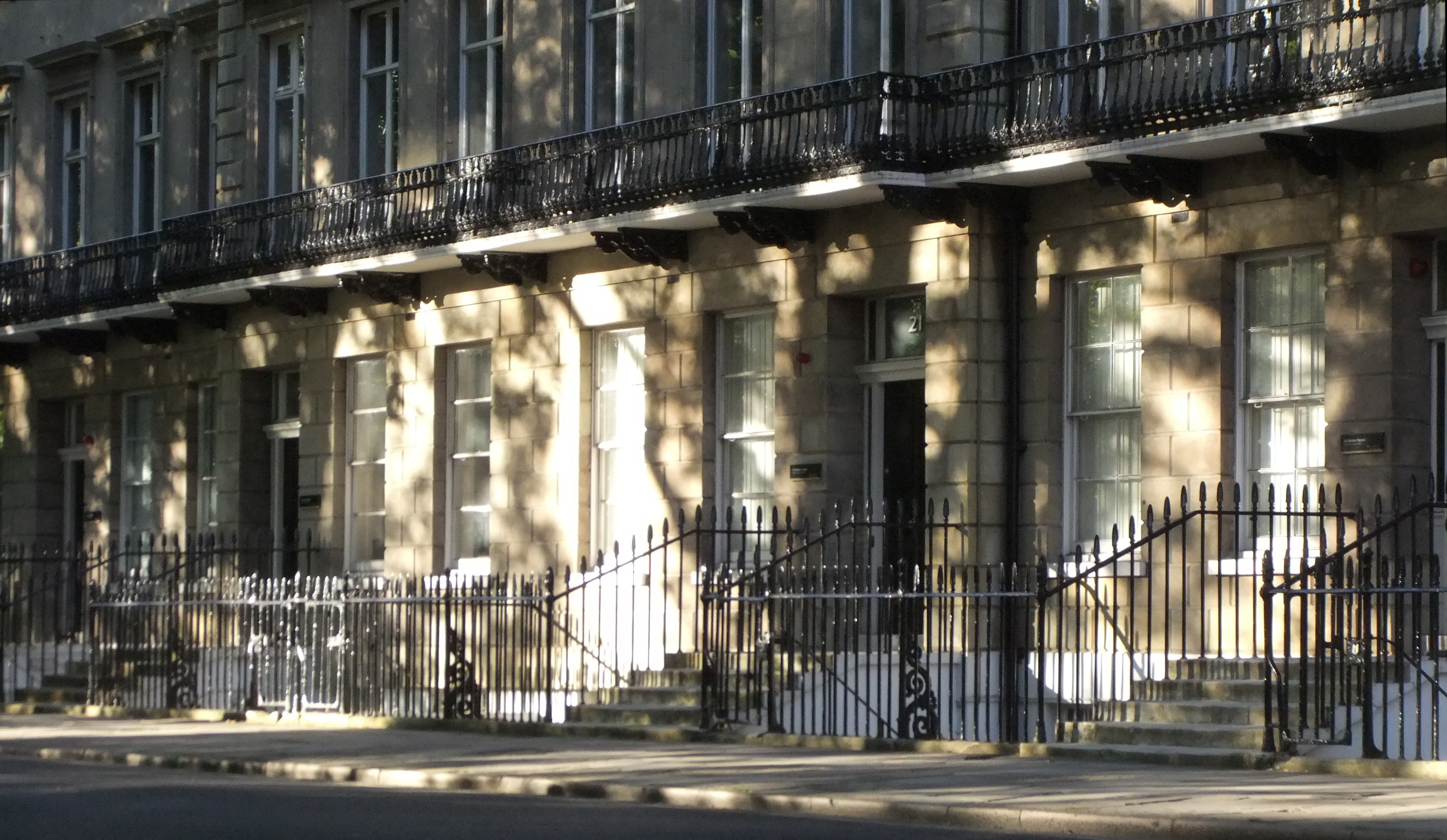
21 Gordon Square, "Arts Annexe I". Home to the University College Phonetics Department starting in 1922.

Armstrong first taught phonetics in 1917 in Daniel Jones's summer course for missionaries; even before then, Jones had planned to give Armstrong a full-time position at the University College Phonetics Department. Those plans were temporarily put on hold when London County Council decided against a budgetary increase for the department in October, but in November 1917, Jones nominated Armstrong to receive a temporary, part-time lectureship, which she started in February 1918. She was finally able to work full-time at the start of the 1918–1919 academic year, becoming the Phonetics Department's first full-time assistant. Armstrong became lecturer in 1920, senior lecturer in 1921, and reader in 1937. Her promotion to readership was announced in The Times and The Universities Review. Armstrong also occasionally taught at the School of Oriental Studies. When Jones had to take a leave of absence the first nine months of 1920, Armstrong became acting head of the department in his stead. During this time, she interviewed and admitted students into the department. Other positions she held at University College were Chairman of the Refectory Committee and Secretary of the Women Staff Common Room. Learned societies Armstrong belonged to included the International Phonetic Association, the Modern Language Association, and the International Congress of Phonetic Sciences.

==== Courses and lectures ====
Armstrong taught classes on the phonetics of French, English, Swedish, and Russian, and, alongside Daniel Jones, a class on speech pathology titled "Lecture-demonstrations on Methods of Correcting Defects of Speech". Armstrong also led ear-training exercises, which were an important part of teaching at the University College Department of Phonetics.

In addition, Armstrong was involved in the teaching of several vacation courses held at University College. In 1919, the Phonetics Department began teaching its popular vacation courses in French and English phonetics. In the inaugural 1919 course, Armstrong conducted daily ear-training exercises for a course intended for those studying and teaching French. Two readers of English Studies who had attended the 1919 summer course for English favourably described Armstrong's ear-tests as "a great help" and "splendid"; these ear-training exercises were praised by the journal Leuvensche Bijdragen. A Dutch participant in the 1921 session lauded Armstrong's ear-training classes and provided a description thereof. By the 1921 summer course, she not only conducted the ear-training exercises, but also lectured on English phonetics alongside Jones; she later gave lectures on English phonetics for a "Course of Spoken English for Foreigners", taught with Jones and Arthur Lloyd James during the summer of 1930. An advertisement for the 1935 summer course described the whole programme as being "under the general direction" of Jones and Armstrong; that year included lectures taught by Armstrong and John Rupert Firth as well as ear-training exercises led by Jones and Armstrong.

In October 1922, Armstrong delivered a public lecture at University College about the use of phonetics in teaching French. The Verse Speaking Fellowship invited her to speak at their annual conference in 1933. She travelled to Sweden in 1925 to deliver lectures on English intonation, going to Gothenburg in September and Stockholm in October. In April 1927, she gave a lecture on English intonation to a meeting of the Modern Language Society of Helsinki, Finland. Other countries Armstrong travelled to in order to give lectures included the Netherlands and the Soviet Union.

==== Students ====
Armstrong had several students who were well-known scholars and linguists themselves. Indian linguist Suniti Kumar Chatterji studied at the University of London from 1919 to 1921 for his D.Litt.; while he was there, Armstrong and Ida C. Ward taught him phonetics and drilled him with ear-training and transcription exercises. John Rupert Firth, who would later work at the University College Phonetics Department himself along Armstrong, was a student at University College from 1923 to 1924; the classes he took included Armstrong's course in French Phonetics. In the summer of 1934, Scottish phonetician J. C. Catford, then age 17, took a class in French phonetics taught by Armstrong and Hélène Coustenoble. Armstrong taught advanced phonetics to American linguist Lorenzo Dow Turner while he was doing postdoctoral research at the School of Oriental Studies from 1936 to 1937. French Canadian linguist Jean-Paul Vinay, who got his master's degree studying under Armstrong in 1937 and later worked alongside her, specifically pointed out Armstrong's kindness and articulatory prowess. While Australian literary scholar Robert Guy Howarth was studying for his doctorate in English from 1937 to 1938, he also got a certificate in phonetics and took "A Course of General Phonetics", taught by Armstrong and others.

=== Writing and research ===
==== Le Maître Phonétique ====
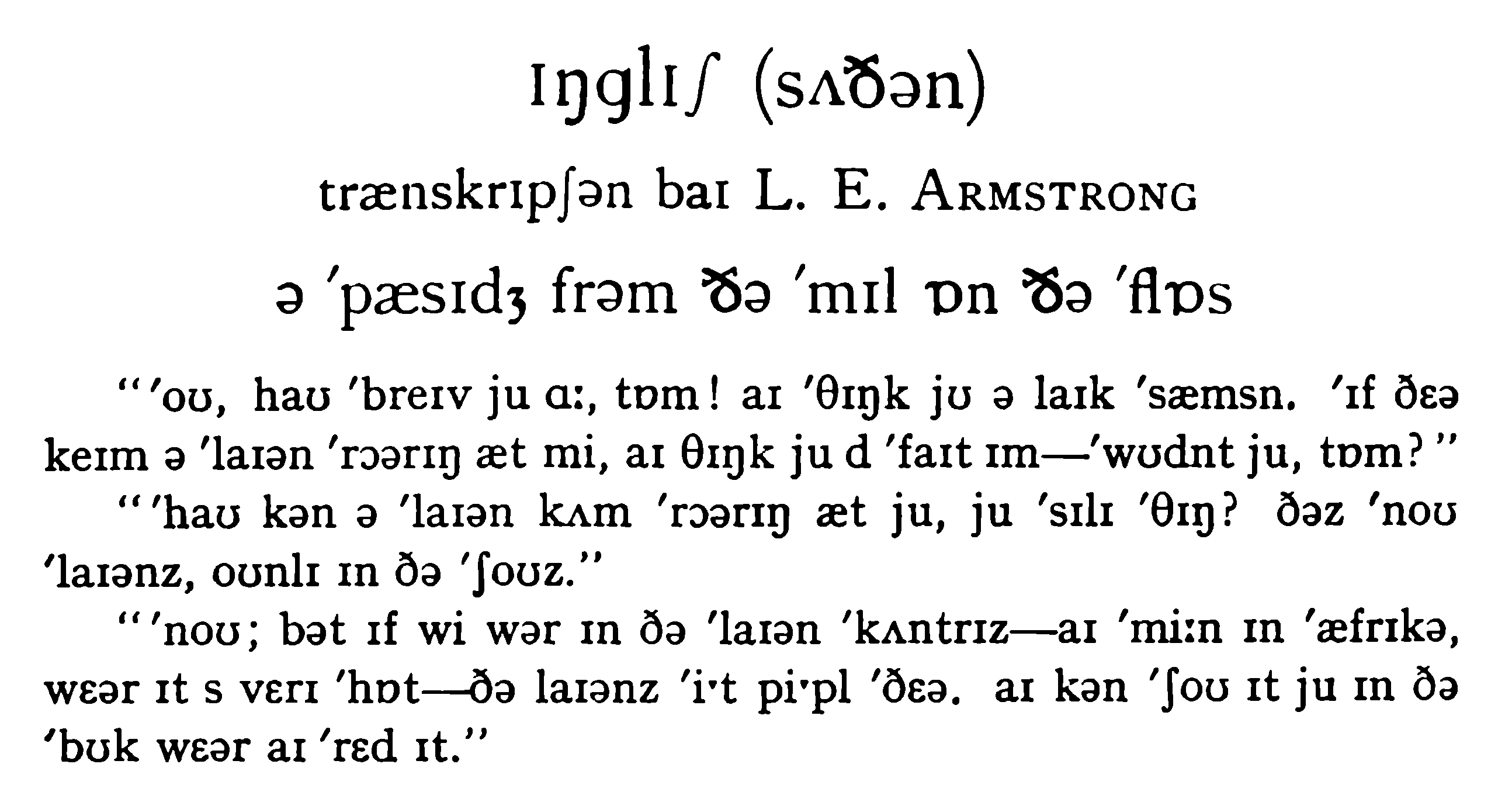
Excerpt from Armstrong's transcription of The Mill on the Floss by George Eliot in a Southern English accent. (Note: Prior to 1927 the stress diacritic in the International Phonetic Alphabet was an acute mark ˊ instead of a vertical line ˈ.) It appeared in the inaugural 1921 issue of Textes pour nos Élèves.

The International Phonetic Association had suspended publication of its journal Le Maître Phonétique during World War I, but in 1921 it began producing a yearly publication Textes pour nos Élèves ("Texts for our students"), which consisted of texts transcribed in the International Phonetic Alphabet (IPA) from various languages, such as English, French, German, Italian, and Spanish. Armstrong contributed several transcriptions of English texts throughout its volumes.

In 1923, Le Maître Phonétique resumed publication and started its third series. Armstrong was listed as the secrétaire de rédaction (subeditor) starting from the July–September 1923 issue (3rd Ser., No. 3); she held this position throughout the January–March 1936 issue (3rd Ser., No. 53). Armstrong had a significant role in the renewal of the journal and of the International Phonetic Association, whose activities depended on the journal's publication. She wrote various book reviews in the journal's kɔ̃trɑ̃dy (Note: The journal Le Maître Phonétique was written entirely in phonetic transcription, using the International Phonetic Alphabet; the official language of the journal was French, although many articles were written in English. In contrast to modern conventions, phonetic transcriptions at this time were not regularly placed in brackets.) (Comptes rendus, "Reports") section, as well as phonetic transcriptions of English texts in its parti dez elɛːv (Partie des élèves, "Students' section").

Le Maître Phonétique's spesimɛn (Spécimens, "Specimens") section consisted of phonetic sketches of less-studied languages accompanied by the phonetic transcription of a short text. For instance, one year Le Maître Phonétique had specimens of Gã, Biscayan, Japanese English, Poitevin, and Punjabi. Armstrong's first specimen was of Swedish and published in 1927; it consisted of an inventory of Swedish vowels and a transcription of "ˊmanˑən sɔm ˇtapˑadə ˇykˑsan" (Note: In Armstrong's IPA transcription of Swedish, the acute mark ˊ and caron ˇ are tone letters before a word to denote Swedish pitch accent. The acute mark represents Tone 1 or Acute Accent; the caron represents Tone 2 or Grave Accent (what Armstrong refers to as compound tone). This convention is discussed in §51 of the 1912 edition of The Principles of the IPA and §36 of the 1949 edition.) (Mannen som tappade yxan, "The man who dropped his axe"), a translation of "The Honest Woodcutter", as pronounced by Fröken Gyllander of Stockholm. Earlier, Swedish grammarian Immanuel Björkhagen had thanked Armstrong for her assistance in describing the phonetics and sound-system of Swedish in his 1923 book Modern Swedish Grammar. Armstrong's second specimen, published in 1929, was of Russian and consisted of a transcription of an excerpt of Nikolai Gogol's "May Night, or the Drowned Maiden". Armstrong had also corrected the proof of M. V. Trofimov and Daniel Jones's 1923 book The Pronunciation of Russian. Armstrong also did research on Arabic phonetics, but never published anything on the subject, although she wrote a review of British missionary William Henry Temple Gairdner's book on Arabic phonetics for Le Maître Phonétique.

==== London Phonetic Readers Series ====
Armstrong's first two books, An English Phonetic Reader (1923) and A Burmese Phonetic Reader (1925, with Pe Maung Tin), were part of the London Phonetics Readers Series, edited by Daniel Jones. Books in this series provided a phonetic sketch as well as texts transcribed in the International Phonetic Alphabet. Her English Phonetic Reader included transcriptions of passages written by Alfred George Gardiner, Henry James, Robert Louis Stevenson, Thomas Hardy, and John Ruskin. These transcriptions reflected Armstrong's own speech; she did not indicate variation due to different dialects or registers. Jones had encouraged Armstrong to write a phonetic reader of English in "narrow transcription". One of the chief distinctions of "narrow transcription" for English was the use of the additional phonetic symbols for vowels, such as [ɪ] (as in the RP pronunciation of KIT), [ʊ] (FOOT), and [ɒ] (LOT). In the analysis behind a Jonesian "broad transcription" of English, the principal difference between those vowels and the vowels [iː] (FLEECE), [uː] (GOOSE), and [ɔː] (THOUGHT), respectively, was thought of as length instead of quality; accordingly, the absence or presence of a length diacritic was used to distinguish these vowels instead of separate IPA characters. Armstrong's narrow transcription for the reader used these extra vowel symbols and explicitly marked vowel length with the diacritics ˑ 'half-long' and ː 'long'. She also discussed the use of narrow transcription in her first paper for Le Maître Phonetique, published as one of its artiklə də fɔ̃ (Articles de fond, "Feature articles"); Armstrong implored the journal's readers to learn to use the extra symbols. Armstrong's An English Phonetic Reader, Armstrong and Ward's Handbook of English Intonation, and Ward's The Phonetics of English were the first to popularize this transcription system for English. The fourth and final impression of An English Phonetic Reader was printed in 1956.

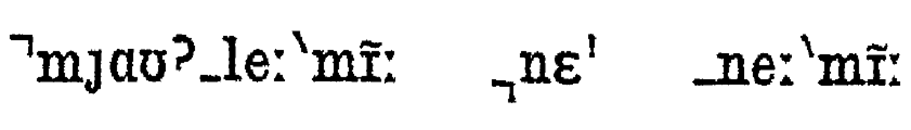
Transcription from A Burmese Phonetic Reader. (Note: In Armstrong and Pe Maung Tin's IPA transcription of Burmese, ˺ represents "slightly falling" tone and its vertical position denotes whether it is high or low (p. 21); ˍ represents a low, level tone (pp. 22–23); and ˋ represents a high falling tone (pp. 24–25). These tone letters appeared before the syllable whose tone they describe. The symbol ˈ denotes "a weak closure of the glottis" (p. 22), and ȷ represents a phoneme typically realized as a palatal approximant (pp. 18–19).) Compare: myauʔ ˍle ˋmiŋ nɛ ˍne ˋmiŋ (Firth); mjaʊʔlemɪ̃́nɛ̰ neːmɪ̃́ (Watkins)

Armstrong's second book for the series was a Burmese reader, co-written with the Burmese scholar Pe Maung Tin. Pe Maung Tin had the opportunity to study phonetics at University College and collaborate with Armstrong while he was in London studying law at Inner Temple and attending lectures by Charles Otto Blagden about Old Mon inscriptions. Prior to the publication of the Burmese reader, Pe Maung Tin had written a Burmese specimen for Le Maître Phonétique. Canadian American linguist William Cornyn described their reader as having an "elaborate description" of Burmese phonetics. Armstrong and Pe Maung Tin developed the first transcription system for Burmese in accordance to principles of the International Phonetic Association; this was a "very detailed" transcription scheme, which made use of five diacritics for tone, some of which could be placed at multiple heights.

One contemporary review of this book referred to the amount of specialized phonetic symbols and diacritics as a "profusion of diacritical marks that is rather confusing". Pe Maung Tin responded to this by clarifying the diacritics were necessary to convey the interaction of tone and prosody and to ensure that English speakers did not read the texts with an English intonation. He also defended other transcription choices like using "sh" to represent an aspirated alveolar fricative as in the Burmese word ဆီ (IPA: [sʰì], "oil"), which Armstrong and Pe Maung Tin transcribed as "ˍshiː"; the reviewer thought it was confusing to use "sh" to refer to a sound other than the post-alveolar fricative represented by the English ⟨sh⟩ as in the word she (/ʃiː/). R. Grant Brown, a former member of the Indian Civil Service in Burma, praised A Burmese Phonetic Reader for being the joint work of a phonetician and a native speaker, writing "This excellent little book sets a standard which other writers on living Oriental languages will have to follow if they do not wish their work to be regarded as second-rate", although he thought their transcription system was "too elaborate for ordinary use". British linguist John Rupert Firth used a broad transcription which he simplified from Armstrong and Pe Maung Tin's system based in part on his experience using their Reader with Burmese speakers and with students of Burmese phonetics at Oxford's Indian Institute. Burmese linguist Minn Latt said their transcription system used too many "unfamiliar symbols" for an ideal romanization scheme. British linguist Justin Watkins used Armstrong and Pe Maung Tin's translation of "The North Wind and the Sun" for his 2001 illustration of the IPA for Burmese in the Journal of the International Phonetic Association.

==== English intonation ====
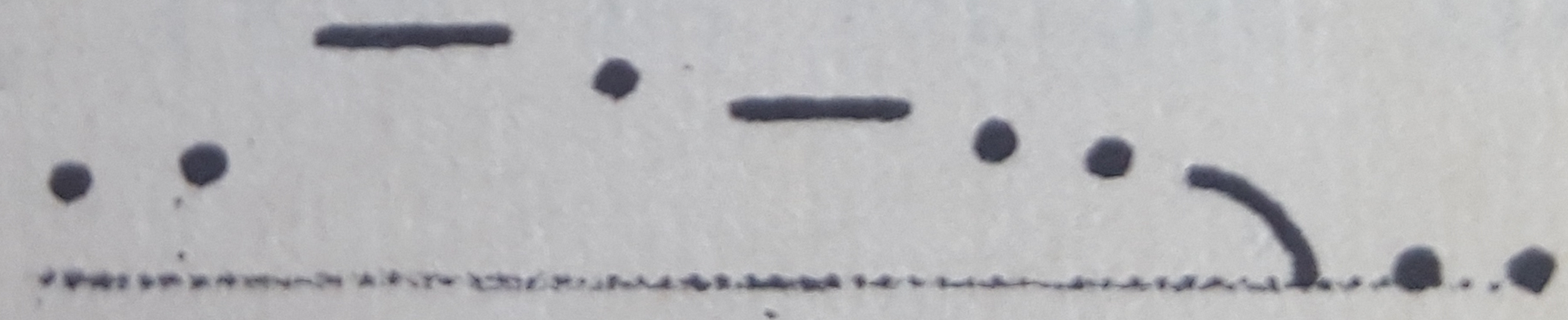
Tune 1: "He's a very wonderful pianist."

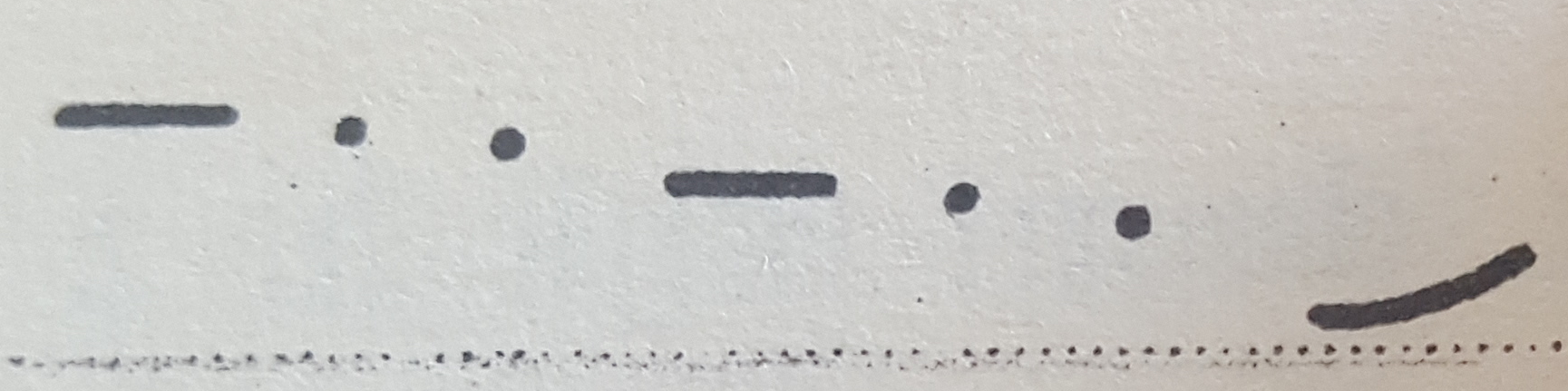
Tune 2: "Have you been staying there long?"

Armstrong and her colleague Ida C. Ward published their book Handbook of English Intonation in 1926. It was accompanied by three double-sided gramophone records which consisted of Armstrong and Ward reading English passages. These recordings appeared in bibliographies of speech and theatre training for decades. A 1940 study at the University of Berlin analyzed Armstrong's recitation of prose versus poetry in part using one of her Handbook records; the monograph was published in the series Lebendige Sprache edited by Wilhelm Horn and Kurt Ketterer. Armstrong and Ward analyzed all English intonation patterns as essentially consisting of just two "Tunes": Tune 1 is typified by ending in a fall, and Tune 2 by ending in a rise. American linguist Kenneth Lee Pike called their analysis "valuable" for learners of English because it found commonalities in the various uses of rising contours and of falling contours. In 1943, Danish linguist C.A. Bodelsen wrote "there is fairly general agreement" about the Tune 1 and Tune 2 classification; he also compares the Tune 1 and Tune 2 system of Handbook of English Intonation with the intonation classifications in An Outline of English Phonetics by Daniel Jones and English Intonation by Harold E. Palmer.

Armstrong and Ward transcribed intonation in a system where lines and dots correspond to stressed and unstressed syllables, respectively, and vertical position corresponds to pitch. This system made use of a keyless stave with only two lines representing the boundaries of a speaker's vocal range. Their method of transcribing intonation was anticipated by the one used in H. S. Perera and Daniel Jones's (1919) reader for Sinhalese, and the preface to Handbook of English Intonation notes an inspiration in Hermann Klinghardt's notation for intonation. Klinghardt said his book would have been impossible without Daniel Jones; his exercises also share similarities to Jones's intonation curves. Armstrong and Ward used a system of discrete dots and marks to mark the intonation contour because they found it easier for learners of English to follow than a continuous line.

Handbook of English Intonation had a lasting impact for decades, particularly in regards to teaching English. Pike wrote that the work was "an influential contribution to the field"; in 1948, he described it as providing "the most widely-accepted analysis of British intonation". Armstrong and Ward's book remained in print and in use at least up until the 1970s. Despite its popularity, its analysis has been criticized for being overly simplistic. British phonetician Jack Windsor Lewis wrote their handbook made "little or no advance in analysing the structure of English intonation", and criticised their system for notating intonation for having "so much superfluous detail". Pike wrote their tune-based intonation "proves insufficient to symbolize adequately (i.e. structurally) the intricate underlying system of contours in contrast one with another". Armstrong and Ward themselves wrote that they were aware there is "a greater wealth of detail than [is] here recorded", but that "attention has been concentrated on the simplest forms of intonation used in conversation and in the reading of narrative and descriptive prose" since the book's intended reader was a foreign learner of English. Armstrong and Ward's method for transcribing prosody was very popular; books on English prosody would often use their graphical method to provide introductory examples of intonation patterns even if they made use of other transcription methods.

==== French phonetics and intonation ====
In 1932 she wrote The Phonetics of French: A Practical Handbook. Its stated goals are "to help English students of French pronunciation and especially teachers of French pronunciation". To this end, it contains various practice exercises and teaching hints. In the first chapter, she discusses techniques for French teachers to conduct ear-training exercises which were such an important part of her own teaching of phonetics. The influences of Daniel Jones's lectures on French phonetics can be seen in Armstrong's discussion of French rhotic and stop consonants. Armstrong's publication of this well-received book "widened the circle of her influence". In 1998, Scottish phonetician J. C. Catford wrote that he believed this book to still be the "best practical introduction to French phonetics".

Chapter XVII of The Phonetics of French was about intonation, but her main work on the topic was the 1934 book Studies in French Intonation co-written with her colleague Hélène Coustenoble. They focused on the speech of "educated speakers of northern France". This book was written for English learners of French as well; it provided the first comprehensive description of French intonation. French intonation was also analyzed in terms of tunes; it was a configuration-based approach, where intonation consists of a sequence of discrete pitch contours. French intonation essentially consists of three contours in their analysis, namely: rise-falling, falling, and rising. Armstrong and Coustenoble made use of a prosodic unit known as a Sense Group, which they defined as "each of the smallest groups of grammatically related words into which many sentences may be divided". The book also provides discussion of English intonation in order to demonstrate how French intonation differs. One contemporary review noted that "it seems to have received a favourable reception" in England. The book contained numerous exercises, which led to another reviewer calling it "an excellent teaching manual" as well. Oxford linguist Alfred Ewert called the book "very useful" in 1936, Austrian philologist Elise Richter called it "an admirable achievement" in 1938, and American linguist Robert A. Hall Jr. called the book "excellent" in 1946. It has been later described as "highly idealized" for being based on conventions of reading French prose out loud. It is considered to be a "classic work on French intonation".

==== Somali ====
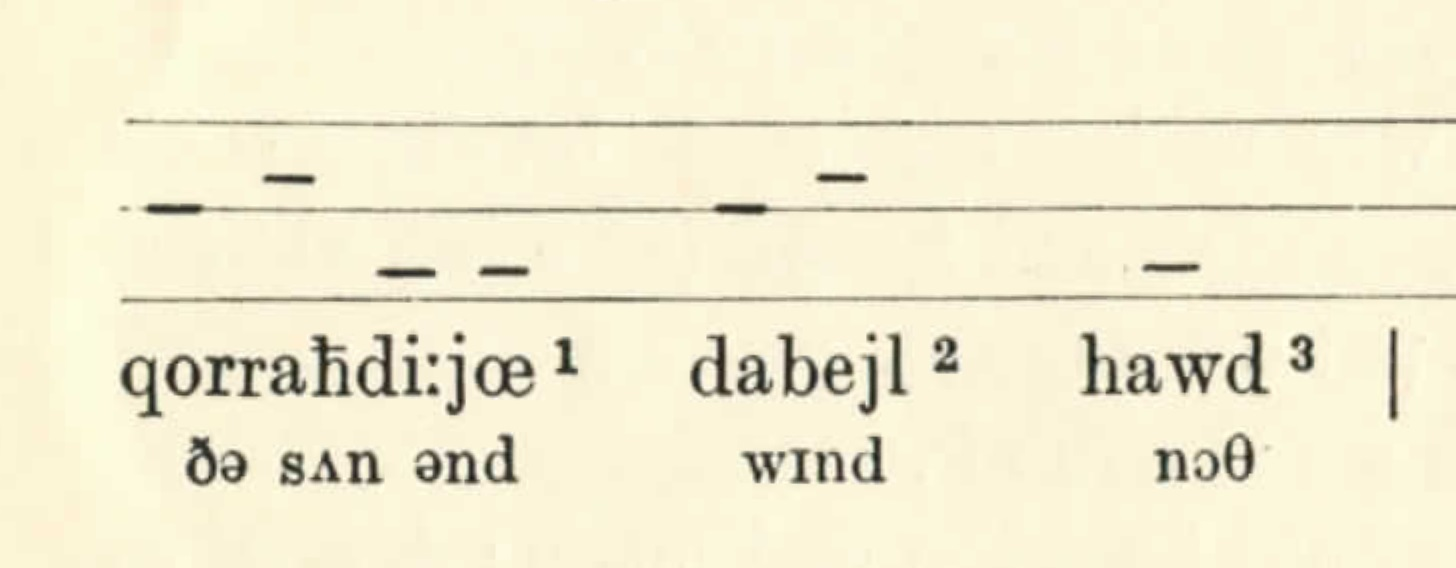
The beginning of Armstrong's transcription of "The North Wind and the Sun" in her 1933 specimen (Note: A similar system for marking tone and intonation was used for the texts in Armstrong (1934) and Armstrong (1940) although the staff in the latter lacked a centre-line. The numbers in the image refer to footnotes.)

Armstrong started doing phonetic research on Somali in 1931. She published a Somali specimen for Le Maître Phonétique in 1933, as well as a translation of "The North Wind and the Sun" for the 1933 Italian version of Principles of the International Phonetic Association, but her main work on Somali was "The Phonetic Structure of Somali", published in 1934. Her research was based on two Somalis, and she gives their names as "Mr. Isman Dubet of Adadleh, about 25 miles northeast of Hargeisa, and Mr. Haji Farah of Berbera"; in Somali orthography, these names would be Cismaan Dubad and Xaaji Faarax. These men were apparently sailors living in the East End of London, and Armstrong likely worked with them from 1931 to 1933. Farah's pronunciation had been the basis for Armstrong's 1933 specimen, and he had also been the subject for a radiographic phonetic study conducted by UCL phonetician Stephen Jones.

Armstrong's analysis influenced a report by the Somalists Bogumił Andrzejewski and Musa Haji Ismail Galal, which in turn influenced Somali linguist Shire Jama Ahmed's successful proposal for the Somali Latin alphabet. In particular, Andrzejewski gave credit to her for the practice of doubled vowels to represent long vowels in Somali. Andrzejweski mentioned some disadvantages of Armstrong's orthography proposal with respect to vowels, writing that "Armstrong's system is too narrow to deal with the fluctuations in the extents of Vowel Harmony and so rigid that its symbols often imply pauses (or absence of pauses) and a particular speed and style of pronunciation". He also claimed that Armstrong's orthographic proposal for Somali vowels would be "too difficult for the general public (both Somali and non-Somali) to handle".

In 1981, American phonologist Larry Hyman called Armstrong's paper "pioneering"; she was the first to thoroughly examine tone or pitch in Somali. She analyzed Somali as being a tone language with four tones: high level, mid level, low level, and falling, and she provided a list of minimal pairs which are distinguished by tone. German Africanist August Klingenheben responded to Armstrong's work in a 1949 paper. He called Armstrong's work "an excellent phonetic study", but argued that Somali was not a true tone language but rather a stress language. Andrzejewski wrote in 1956 that Armstrong's phonetic data were "more accurate than those of any other author on Somali"; he analyzed Somali as being "a border-line case between a tone language and a stress language", making use of what he called "accentual features". There remains a debate as to whether Somali should be considered a tone language or a pitch accent language.

Armstrong was the first to describe the vowel system of Somali. A 2014 bibliography on the Somali language called Armstrong's paper "seminal" and notes she provides a more detailed description of Somali vowels than other works. She was also the first to discuss vowel harmony in Somali; her vowel harmony analysis was praised by Italian Somalist Martino Mario Moreno. Australian British linguist Roy Clive Abraham wrote that he agreed with Armstrong on most parts regarding Somali phonetics: "there are very few points where I disagree with her". Austro-Hungarian linguist Werner Vycichl wrote that Armstrong's study "opens a new chapter of African studies". In 1992, Trinity College, Dublin linguist John Ibrahim Saeed said Armstrong's paper was "even now the outstanding study of Somali phonetics", and in 1996, Martin Orwin wrote that it "remains essential reading for anyone interested in pursuing any aspect of the sound system of Somali".

==== Kikuyu ====
Armstrong wrote a brief sketch of Kikuyu phonetics for the book Practical Phonetics for Students of African Languages by Diedrich Westermann and Ida C. Ward. Her linguistic consultant was a man whom she refers to as Mr. Mockiri. She also wrote a sketch on Luganda phonetics for this book. Her main work on Kikuyu was The Phonetic and Tonal Structure of Kikuyu published posthumously in 1940. Jomo Kenyatta, who would later become the first president of Kenya, was Armstrong's linguistic consultant for this book. He was employed by the Phonetics Department from 1935 to 1937 in order for Armstrong to carry out her research; this was while Kenyatta was studying social anthropology at the London School of Economics under Bronisław Malinowski. The book was largely finished when Armstrong died; only Chapter XXII "Tonal Forms of Adjectives" remained to be written, although Armstrong had already written notes for it. Daniel Jones entrusted Beatrice Honikman to write the remaining chapter and finalize the book's preparations for its 1940 publication; she was a lecturer at SOAS who had earlier done work on Kikuyu with Kenyatta, and she was also once Armstrong's student. Chapter IV "The Consonant Phonemes" contains twelve kymograph tracings of Kikuyu words to illustrate phonetic details; the phonetic kymograph was an important instrument for experimental phonetic research at University College under Jones.

The book contains an appendix in which Armstrong proposes an orthography for Kikuyu. She suggested that the voiced dental fricative [ð] be represented by ⟨d⟩ and the prenasalized plosive [ⁿd] (Note: Armstrong uses digraphs, e.g., ⟨nd⟩, to transcribe prenasalized stops in Kikuyu. She writes, "It is phonetically sound to consider mb, nd, ŋg and nj as a single consonant sound with a nasal 'kick-off' and to regard these as phonemes of the language. A single symbol might be used to represent each of these phonemes, and thus the ideal of one letter per phoneme would be achieved. In this book, however, digraphs are used.") by ⟨nd⟩; in parallel were the pairs [β] (Note: Armstrong uses the symbol ⟨ʋ⟩ instead of ⟨β⟩ to represent the "weak bi-labial voiced fricative" in Kikuyu. This was consistent with Practical Orthography of African Languages and had been the convention of the IPA prior to 1927.) ⟨b⟩ / [ᵐb] ⟨mb⟩ and [ɣ] ⟨g⟩ / [ᵑg] ⟨ŋg⟩. Westermann and Ward also advocated the use of ⟨d⟩ for [ð] in their book. Kenyatta thought Kikuyu people would not accept the use of ⟨d⟩ for [ð] because in the other orthographies Kikuyu people would be familiar with, namely English and Swahili, ⟨d⟩ represents a stop consonant, not a fricative; Armstrong noted there did not seem to be any objection to using ⟨b⟩ and ⟨g⟩ to represent fricatives in Kikuyu orthography even though they represent stops in English. The use of ⟨d⟩ for [ð] has also been criticised as there is no alternation between [ð] and [ⁿd] in Kikuyu unlike the other two pairs; furthermore the Kikuyu voiced dental fricative phonologically patterns with voiceless fricatives instead of with other voiced ones.

Armstrong also proposed that the seven vowels of Kikuyu be represented by the IPA symbols ⟨i, e, ɛ, a, ɔ, o, u⟩; this followed the practical orthography, now known as the Africa Alphabet, devised by the International Institute of African Languages and Cultures. This system avoided the use of diacritics which Armstrong called "tiresome", and which often were omitted when writing. A drawback to this system is that it is less faithful to etymology and obscures the relationship with related languages. Kikuyu leaders also disliked the use of the specialized phonetic symbols ⟨ɛ⟩ and ⟨ɔ⟩, finding them impractical since they could not easily be written on a typewriter. Armstrong also proposed that the velar nasal be written with the letter ⟨Ŋ, ŋ⟩ and that the palatal nasal be written with the digraph ⟨ny⟩ (although she wrote she personally would prefer the letter ⟨Ɲ, ɲ⟩). The education authorities in Kenya briefly recommended that schools use Armstrong's system. In modern Kikuyu orthography, the voiced dental fricative is written ⟨th⟩, the velar and palatal nasals are respectively as ⟨ng'⟩ and ⟨ny⟩, and the vowels [e, ɛ, o, ɔ] are respectively written ⟨ĩ, e, ũ, o⟩.

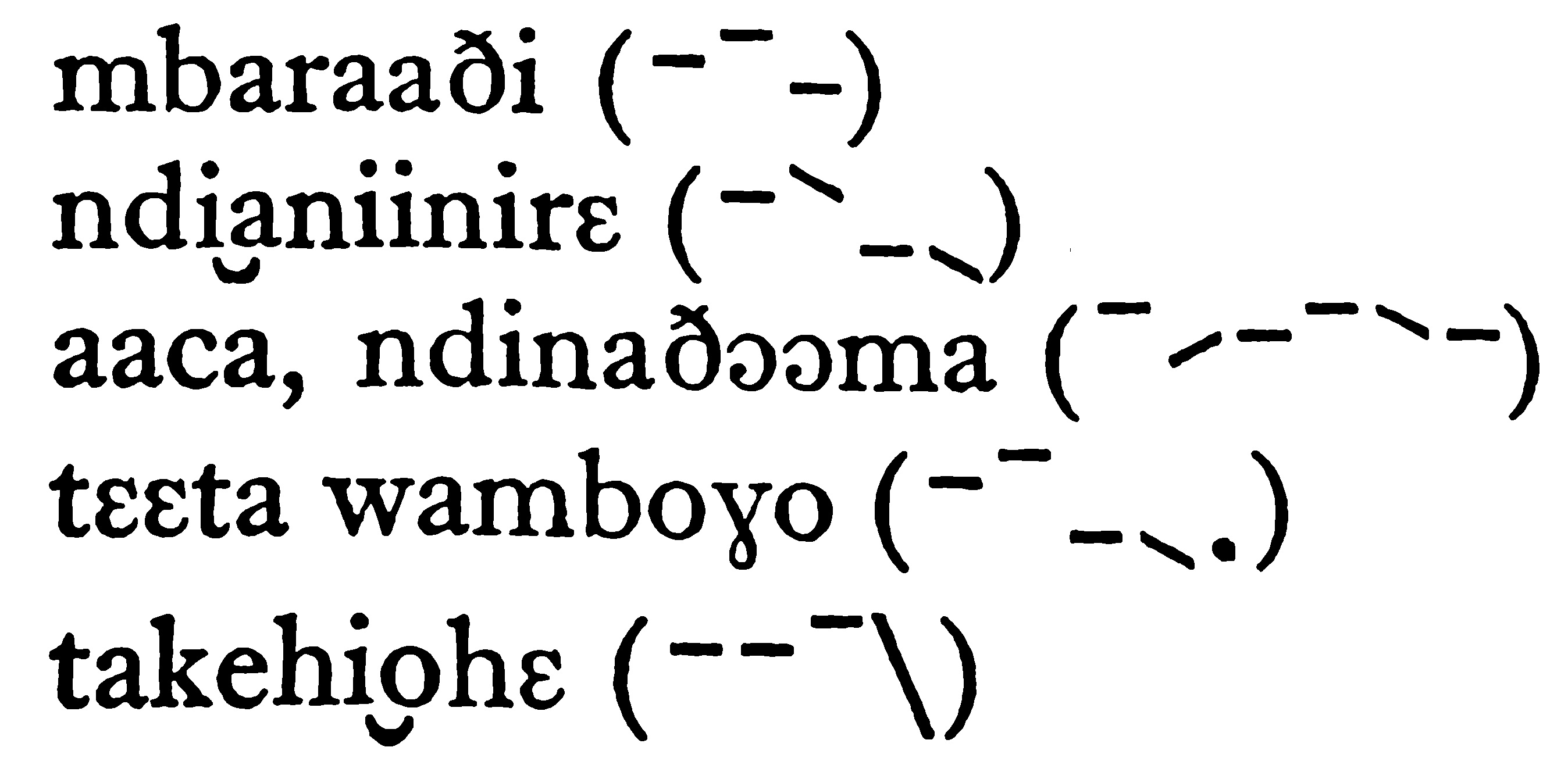
Armstrong's transcription of the Kikuyu words meaning: horse "mid, high, fairly-low—all level tones"; Didn't he finish? "mid, high-mid fall, low, low fall"; No, I didn't read it "high, low-mid rise, mid, high, high-mid fall, mid"; Do call Wambogo "mid, high, low, low fall, very-low fall"; Do please hurry up "mid, mid, high, high-low fall"

Armstrong's book provided the first in-depth description of tone in any East African Bantu language. Throughout the book, Armstrong represented tone with a pictorial system; a benefit of this method was that she did not need to have a tonemic analysis. A sequence of dashes at varying heights and angles accompanied each word or sentence throughout the book. Armstrong's description of Kikuyu tone involved grouping stems into tone classes; each tone class was defined in terms of its tonal allomorphy depending on surrounding context. Subclasses were based on properties like length or structure of the stem. Armstrong discussed five tone classes for verbs, named Tonal Class I–V, and a small group of verbs which do not belong to any of those five classes, seven tone classes for nouns, each named after a word in that class, e.g., the moondo Tonal Class (Gikuyu: mũndũ "person"), and three tone classes for adjectives, each named after a stem in that class, e.g., the ‑ɛɣa Tonal Class (Gikuyu: ‑ega "good").

American Canadian linguist William J. Samarin noted Armstrong conflated tone and intonation for the most part; he claimed this led to "exaggerated complexities" in her description, particularly with respect to the final intonational fall in interrogatives. When Armstrong wrote her manuscript, analysis of tone was a nascent field and the complex relationship between phonemic tonemes and phonetic pitch led phoneticians to analyze languages as having large numbers of tones. In 1952, SOAS linguist Lyndon Harries was able to take Armstrong's data and analyze Kikuyu tone as only having two underlying tone levels. American linguist Mary Louise Pratt also re-analyzed Armstrong's Kikuyu data as only having two levels. Pratt also noted Armstrong did not distinguish allophonically long vowels from vowels which are phonemically long. University of Nairobi linguist Kevin C. Ford wrote that if Armstrong had not died before completing this book "there is no doubt she could have expanded her range of data and probably presented some rigorous analysis, which is sadly lacking in the published work". The South African linguist Clement Doke considered Armstrong's book to be "a model of meticulous investigation and recording", writing in 1945 that it should "serve as a model" for subsequent work on tone in Bantu languages, and the American phonologist Nick Clements described it in a 1984 paper as "an extremely valuable source of information due to the comprehensiveness of its coverage and accuracy of the author's phonetic observations". According to The Oxford Guide to the Bantu Languages, published in 2025, Armstrong's work on Kikuyu was "a significant contribution to [the] pioneering works [on Bantu phonetics]".

== Personal life ==
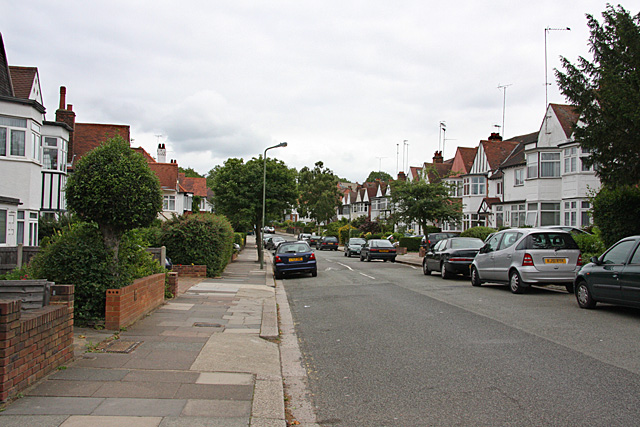
Street in Church End, Finchley, where Armstrong and Boyanus lived

Armstrong married Simon Charles Boyanus (Russian: Семён Карлович Боянус, romanized: Semyón Kárlovich Boyánus; 8 July 1871 – 19 July 1952) on 24 September 1926, although she still continued to go by "Miss Armstrong" professionally after marriage. Boyanus was a professor of English philology at the University of Leningrad, where he worked with Russian linguist Lev Shcherba. He came to the University College Phonetics Department in 1925, where he spent eight months learning English phonetics under Armstrong.

After marriage, Boyanus had to return to the Soviet Union for eight years, while Armstrong had to stay in England. While away, Boyanus worked with Vladimir Müller to produce English–Russian and Russian–English dictionaries. Armstrong assisted with the phonetic transcription for the keywords in the English–Russian volume. She was able to visit Boyanus in Leningrad on two occasions, and he was able to briefly return to London in 1928. Boyanus was finally able to permanently move to England in January 1934, whereupon he became a lecturer in Russian and Phonetics at the School of Slavonic and East European Studies at the University of London. While working at University College, Armstrong lived in Forest Gate and Church End, Finchley.

== Death ==
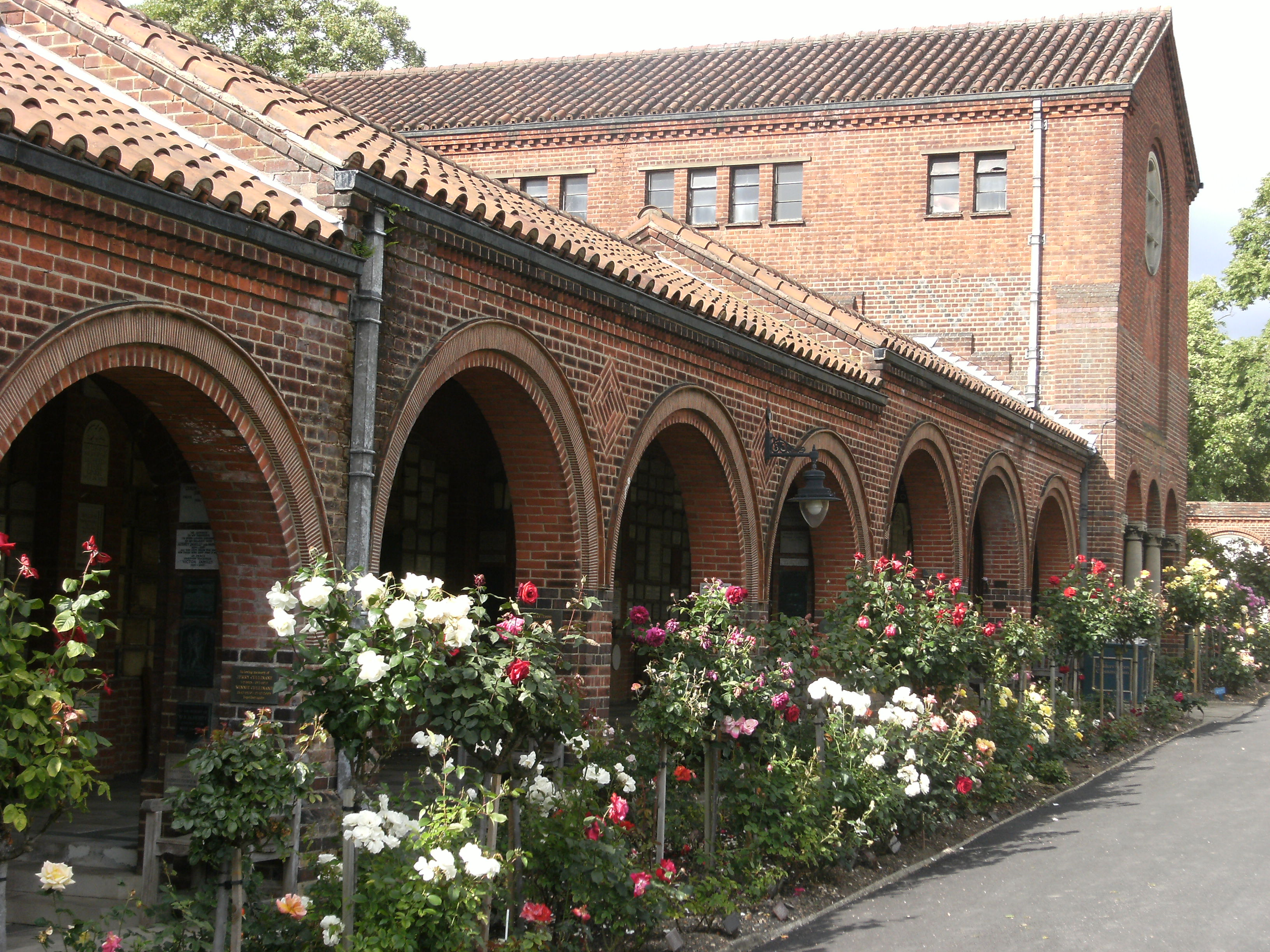
Golders Green Crematorium

In November 1937, Armstrong became sick with a persistent bout of influenza. Her condition worsened, and she had a stroke. She died at Finchley Memorial Hospital, Middlesex, on 9 December 1937, at age 55. There was a service for her at Golders Green Crematorium at noon on 13 December. The University College Provost, Secretary, and Tutor to Women Students were among those present at her funeral. Her obituary was printed in The Times, The New York Times, Nature, Le Maître Phonétique, the Annual Report for University College, and other journals; her death was also reported in Transactions of the Philological Society and the British Society of Speech Therapists' journal Speech, among other publications.

In early 1938, when her widower Simon Boyanus brought up the possibility of publishing Armstrong's Kikuyu manuscript, Daniel Jones arranged for Beatrice Honikman to see it through to publication. Jones was reportedly "deeply affected" by Armstrong's death; he wrote Armstrong's obituary for Le Maître Phonétique, and his preface to The Phonetic Structure of Kikuyu paid homage to her life. When the University College phonetics library had to be restocked after being bombed in World War II during the London Blitz, Jones donated a copy of Armstrong's posthumously published book "as a fitting start in the reconstruction of the Phonetics Departmental Library".

== Selected works ==
- Armstrong, L. E. (1923). An English Phonetic Reader. The London Phonetic Readers. London: University of London Press. hdl:2027/uc1.$b257662.
- Armstrong, L. E.; Pe Maung Tin (1925). A Burmese Phonetic Reader: With English translation. The London Phonetic Readers. London: University of London Press.
- Armstrong, L. E.; Ward, I. C. (1926). Handbook of English Intonation. Cambridge: Heffer. hdl:2027/mdp.39015005783116. [Second edition printed in 1931.]
- Armstrong, L. E. (1932). The Phonetics of French: A Practical Handbook. London: Bell.
- Armstrong, L. E. (1934). "The Phonetic Structure of Somali". Mitteilungen des Seminars für orientalische Sprachen zu Berlin. 37 (Abt. III, Afrikanische Studien): 116–161. [Reprinted. Farnborough: Gregg. 1964. hdl:2307/4698. Archived from the original on 18 October 2017.]
- Coustenoble, H. N.; Armstrong, L. E. (1934). Studies in French Intonation. Cambridge: Heffer.
- Armstrong, L. E. (1940). The Phonetic and Tonal Structure of Kikuyu. London: International African Institute. [Reprinted. London: Routledge. 2018. doi:10.4324/9781315104478]
