= Lilias Armstrong bibliography =

This is a list of works by the English phonetician Lilias Armstrong. It also contains references to contemporary reviews of her books.

== Works by Armstrong ==
=== Books ===
==== An English Phonetic Reader ====
Armstrong, L. E. (1923). An English Phonetic Reader. The London Phonetic Readers. University of London Press. hdl:2027/uc1.$b257662.

Reviews:

- Chatterji, S. K. (June 1924). "[Review of Armstrong 1923]". Reviews. The Calcutta Review. 9 (3): 561.

==== A Burmese Phonetic Reader ====
Armstrong, L. E.; Pe Maung Tin (1925). A Burmese Phonetic Reader: With English translation. The London Phonetic Readers. University of London.

Reviews:

- Brown, R. G. (1925). "Books on Burma and Siam [Review of Armstrong & Pe Maung Tin 1925]". Notices of Books. Journal of the Royal Asiatic Society of Great Britain and Ireland. 57 (4): 737–738. doi:10.1017/S0035869X00169060. JSTOR 25220835.
- Reynolds, H. O. (1927). "Some Notes on 'A Burmese Phonetic Reader' (L. E. Armstrong & Pe Maung Tin)". Journal of the Burma Research Society. 17 (2): 119–125.

Response: Pe Maung Tin (1930). "A Burmese Phonetic Reader". Journal of the Burma Research Society. 20 (1): 49–51.

==== Handbook of English Intonation ====
Armstrong, L. E.; Ward, I. C. (1926). Handbook of English Intonation. Cambridge: Heffer. [Second edition printed in 1931.]

Reviews:

- Bohnhof, A. (1928). "[Review of Armstrong & Ward 1926]". Besprechungen. Neuphilologische Mitteilungen. 29 (4): 269–272. JSTOR 43340731.
- Guittart, L. J. (1927). "[Review of Armstrong & Ward 1926]". Reviews. English Studies. 9 (2): 55–57. doi:10.1080/00138382708596521.
- MacLeod, E. C. (January–March 1927). "[Review of Armstrong & Ward 1926]". kɔ̃trɑ̃dy. Le Maître Phonétique. 3rd. Ser. 17: 7–8. JSTOR 44704300.
- Menzerath, P. (1927–1928). "[Review of Armstrong & Ward 1926]". Kurze Anzeigen. Teuthonista (in German). 4 (2): 179–180. JSTOR 40498568.
- Ruud, M. B. (1928). "[Review of Armstrong & Ward 1926]". Brief Mention. Modern Language Notes. 43 (8): 567. JSTOR 2914433.

==== The Phonetics of French ====
Armstrong, L. E. (1932). The Phonetics of French: A Practical Handbook. London: Bell.

Foreword by Daniel Jones.

Reviews:

- Boillot, F. (1934). "[Review of Armstrong 1932]". Comptes-Rendus. Le Français moderne (in French). 2 (1): 88.
- Dietrich, G. (1933). "[Review of Armstrong 1932]". The English Literary and Educational Review for Continental Readers (4).
- Duraffour, A. [in French] (July–September 1933). "[Review of Armstrong 1932]". kɔ̃trɑ̃dy. Le Maître Phonétique. 3rd Ser. (in French). 43: 50–51. JSTOR 44704607.

Response: Coustenoble, H. (January–March 1934). "nɔt syr la prɔnɔ̃sjɑsjɔ̃ frɑ̃sɛːz" [Note sur la prononciation française]. artiklə də fɔ̃. Le Maître Phonétique. 3rd Ser. (in French). 45: 8–9. JSTOR 44748135.

==== "The Phonetic Structure of Somali" ====
Armstrong, L. E. (1934). "The Phonetic Structure of Somali". Mitteilungen des Seminars für orientalische Sprachen zu Berlin. 37 (Abt. III, Afrikanische Studien): 116–161. [Reprinted. Farnborough: Gregg. 1964. hdl:2307/4698. Archived from the original on 18 October 2017.]

Reviews:

- Lukas, J. (1938). "[Review of Armstrong 1934]". Reviews of Books. Africa: Journal of the International African Institute (in German). 11 (1): 121–122. doi:10.2307/1155231. JSTOR 1155231.

==== Studies in French Intonation ====
Coustenoble, H. N.; Armstrong, L. E. (1934). Studies in French Intonation. Cambridge: Heffer.

Reviews:

- Hedgecock, F. A. (1934–1935). "[Review of Coustenoble & Armstrong 1934]". Reviews. Modern Languages. 16 (5): 163–165.
- Lloyd James, A. (April–June 1936). "[Review of Coustenoble & Armstrong 1934]". kɔ̃trɑ̃dy. Le Maître Phonétique. 3rd Ser. 54: 25–26. JSTOR 44704787.
- Richter, E. (1938). "Neuerscheinungen zur französischen Linguistik". Neuphilologische Monatsschrift (in German). 9: 166–167.
- Simpson, W. (1933–1936). "[Review of Coustenoble & Armstrong 1934]". Bibliographie. Revue des Langues Romanes (in French). 67: 243–247.

==== The Phonetic and Tonal Structure of Kikuyu ====
Armstrong, L. E. (1940). The Phonetic and Tonal Structure of Kikuyu. London: International African Institute. [Reprinted. London: Routledge. 2018. doi:10.4324/9781315104478]

Preface by Daniel Jones.

Reviews:

- Doke, C. M. (1941). "[Review of Armstrong 1940]". Book Reviews. Bantu Studies. 15 (2): 197–198. doi:10.1080/02561751.1941.9676138.
- Ward, I. C. (1941). "[Review of Armstrong 1940]". Reviews of Books. Journal of the Royal African Society. 40 (159): 179–180. JSTOR 717899.

=== Papers and chapters ===
- Armstrong, L. E. (1920). "The Progress of Phonetics Since 1914". In Waterhouse, Gilbert (ed.). The Year Book of Modern Languages 1920. Cambridge University Press. pp. 25–27.
  - Review: Pitollet, Camille [in German] (1922). "[Review of Waterhouse 1920]". Bibliographie. Revue de l'Enseignement des Langues Vivantes. 39 (5): 219–221.
- Armstrong, L. E.; Ward, I. C. (1921). "Phonology". The Year's Work in English Studies. 1 (1): 28–31. doi:10.1093/ywes/1.1.28.
- Murray, H. M. R.; Armstrong, L. E. (1922). "Philology: General Works". This Year's Work in English Studies. 2 (1): 25–32. doi:10.1093/ywes/II.1.25.
- Armstrong, L. E. (July–September 1923). "ə nærouə trænskripʃn fər ɪŋglɪʃ" [A narrower transcription for English]. artiklə də fɔ̃. Le Maître Phonétique. 3rd Ser. 3: 17–19. JSTOR 44704049. (Note: The title appears differently in this issue's sɔmɛːr (French: sommaire), namely "ə næroʊə trænskripʃn fər ɪŋglɪʃ", and in the tablə də matjɛːr (French: table des matières) for 1923, namely "ə næroʊə trænskrɪpʃn fər ɪŋglɪʃ.")
- Bailey, T. G.; Armstrong, L. E.; Lorimer, D. L. R. (1925). "The Sounds of Ṣiṇā". Bulletin of the School of Oriental Studies, University of London. 3 (4): 799–802. doi:10.1017/S0041977X00000495. JSTOR 607089.
- Armstrong, L. E. (July–September 1926). "ðə biː biː siː kəmɪtɪ ɒn prənʌnsɪeɪʃn" [The BBC Committee on Pronunciation]. artiklə də fɔ̃. Le Maître Phonétique. 3rd Ser. 16: 34–35. JSTOR 44704127.
- Armstrong, L. E. (July–September 1933). "The Technique of Speech". Good Speech. 3 (20). London: 2–5.
- Armstrong, L. E. (1933). "Ganda". Practical Phonetics for Students of African Languages. By Westermann, D.; Ward, Ida C. London: International African Institute. pp. 188–197.
- Armstrong, L. E. (1933). "Some Notes on Kikuyu". Practical Phonetics for Students of African Languages. By Westermann, D.; Ward, Ida C. London: International African Institute. pp. 213–216.
- Armstrong, L. E. (July–September 1937). "Speech and the Phonetician". Good Speech. 7 (36). London: 32–36.

=== Specimens ===
- Armstrong, L. E. (April–June 1927). "swiˑdɪʃ" [Swedish]. spesimɛn. Le Maître Phonétique. 3rd Ser. 18: 20–21. JSTOR 44704204.
  Pronunciation: Fröken Gyllander of Stockholm
  Text: "The Honest Woodcutter"
- Armstrong, L. E. (October–December 1929). "rʌʃn" [Russian]. spesimɛn. Le Maître Phonétique. 3rd Ser. 28 (28): 47–48. JSTOR 44748106.
  Text: "May Night, or the Drowned Maiden" by N. V. Gogol
- Bien-ming Chiu (April–June 1930). "tʃainiːz (*əmɔi daiəlekt)" [Chinese (Amoy Dialect)]. spesimɛn. Le Maître Phonétique. 3rd Ser. 30: 38–40. JSTOR 44704354.
  Pronunciation: Bien-ming Chiu of Amoy
  Text: "The North Wind and the Sun"
  (See: Jones, D. (January–March 1938). "Lilias Armstrong†". Le Maître Phonétique. 3rd Ser. 61: 2. JSTOR 44704866. "ði aːtikl in m.f. eiprəl 1930, p. 38 wəz laːdʒli həː wəːk.")
- Tao Yumin (January–March 1933). "futʃau daɪəlɛkt əv tʃaɪniz" [Foochow Dialect of Chinese]. spesimɛn. Le Maître Phonétique. 3rd. Ser. 41. Communicated by L. E. Armstrong: 11–12. JSTOR 44704567.
  Text: "The North Wind and the Sun"
- [Armstrong, L. E.] (1933). "Somali". In Jones, D.; Camilli, A. [in Italian] (eds.). Fondamenti di grafia fonetica. Testi. Hertford, UK: Stephen Austin. pp. 19–20. JSTOR 44704558. [Supplement to Le Maître Phonétique. 3rd Ser. 43. July–September 1933.]
  Text: "The North Wind and the Sun"
  (See: "nɔt". Le Maître Phonétique. 3rd Ser. 43 (43): 59. July–September 1933. JSTOR 44704617. "nuz adrɛsɔ̃ no rəmɛrsimɑ̃ a trwɑ mɑ̃ːbrə ki ɔ̃t y la bɔ̃te d nu dɔne de nuvɛl vɛrsjɔ̃ de "la biːz e l sɔlɛːj" pur nɔtrə syplemɑ̃ Fondamenti di grafia fonetica; [...] e madmwazɛl L. E. Armstrong [a prepare] la vɛrsjɔ̃ [nuvɛl] ɑ̃ sɔmali.")
  Reprinted in: Collins, Beverly; Mees, Inger M., eds. (2003). Daniel Jones: Selected Works. Vol. VII: Selected Papers. London: Routledge. ISBN 978-0-415-23343-9.
- Armstrong, L. E. (October–December 1933). "soʊmɑlɪ" [Somali]. spesimɛn. Le Maître Phonétique. 3rd Ser. 44: 72–75. JSTOR 44704656.
  Pronunciation: Haji Farah of Berbera
  Text: "The North Wind and the Sun"

=== Book reviews ===
- Armstrong, L. E. (January–March 1924). "[Review of French intonation exercises. Translated by Barker, M. L. Cambridge: W. Heffer & Sons. 1923.]". kɔ̃trɑ̃ːdy. Le Maître Phonétique. 3rd Ser. 5: 3. JSTOR 44704082.
- Armstrong, L. E. (January–March 1924). "[Review of Daniel, S. G. (1922). First Steps in Tamil. The Christian Literature Society for India.]". kɔ̃trɑ̃ːdy. Le Maître Phonétique. 3rd Ser. 5: 4. JSTOR 44704084.
- Armstrong, L. E. (October–December 1925). "[Review of Baldwin, A. L (1923). Laeis-Baldwin System of Practical Phonetics for Singers and Speakers. Phonetic Pub. Co.: New York.]". kɔ̃trɑ̃dy. Le Maître Phonétique. 3rd Ser. 12: 27–28. JSTOR 44748060.
- Armstrong, L. E. (July–September 1926). "[Review of Review of Gairdner, W. H. T. (1925). The Phonetics of Arabic. Oxford University Press.]". kɔ̃trɑ̃dy. Le Maître Phonétique. 3rd Ser. 15: 28–29. JSTOR 44704145.
- Armstrong, L. E. (July–September 1926). "[Review of Boyanus, S. Ch. (1926). The Pronunciation of English. For Russian Students. Part I. Sovremennik.]". kɔ̃trɑ̃dy. Le Maître Phonétique. 3rd Ser. 15: 29. JSTOR 44704146.
- Armstrong, L. E. (1927). "[Review of Doke, C. M. (1926). The Phonetics of the Zulu Language. The University of the Witwatersrand Press.]". Reviews of Books. Bulletin of the School of Oriental Studies, London Institution. 4 (3): 670–671. doi:10.1017/S0041977X00103283. JSTOR 606987.
- Armstrong, L. E. (April–June 1928). "[Review of Werner, A.; Werner, M. (1927). A First Swahili Book. London: Sheldon.]". kɔ̃trɑ̃dy. Le Maître Phonétique. 3rd Ser. 22: 35–36. JSTOR 44704247.
- Armstrong, L. E. (April–June 1932). "[Review of Ripman, W. (1931). English Phonetics. London: Dent.]". kɔ̃trɑ̃dy. Le Maître Phonétique. 3rd Ser. 38: 40–41. JSTOR 44704522.

=== Transcription passages for students ===
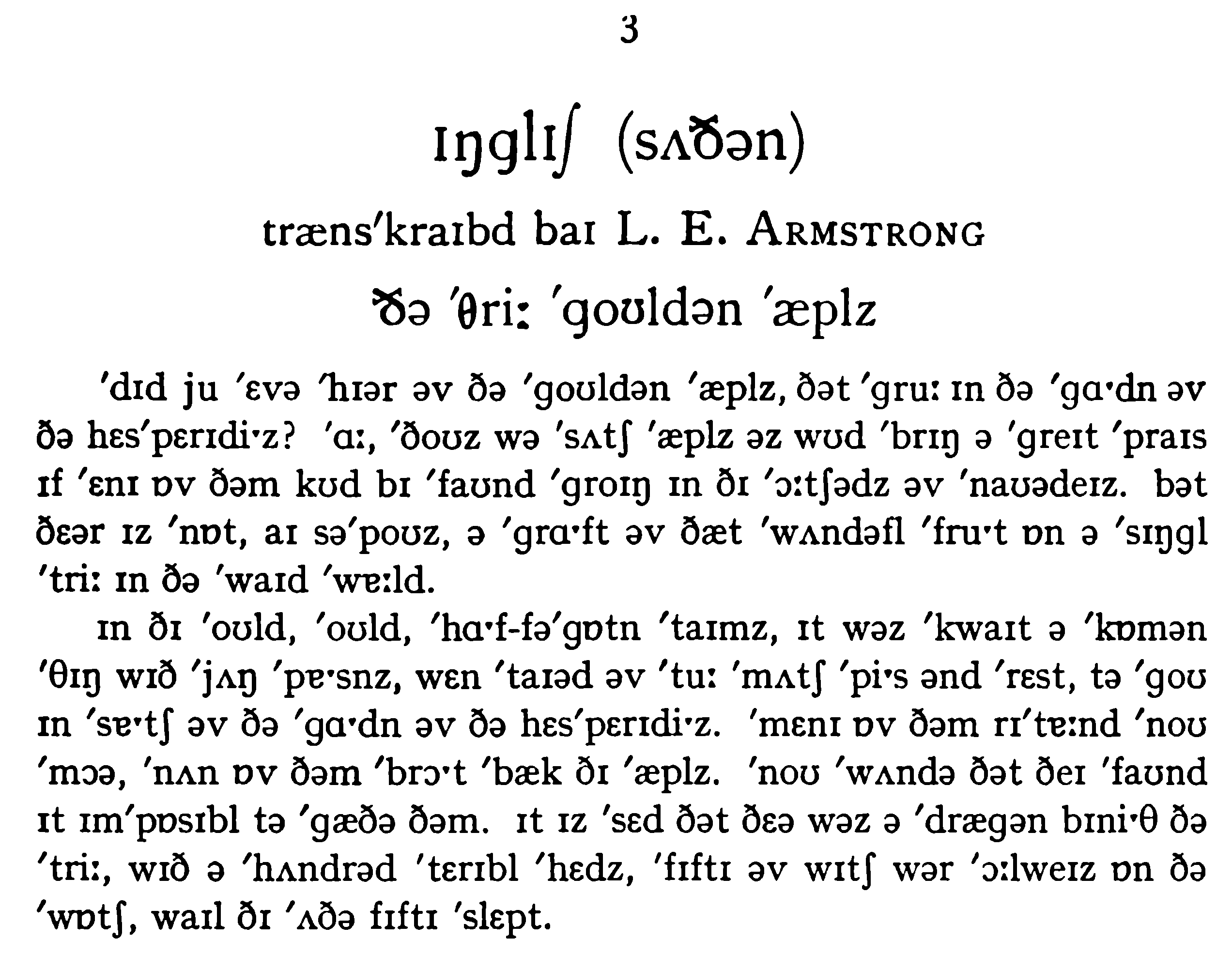
Excerpt from Armstrong 1922

- Armstrong, L. E. (1921). "ɪŋglɪʃ (sʌðən): ə ˊpæsɪdʒ frəm ðə ˊmɪl ɒn ðə ˊflɒs" [English (Southern): A passage from The Mill on the Floss]. Textes pour nos Élèves. 1: 3–4. hdl:2027/wu.89048935472.
- Armstrong, L. E. (1922). "ɪŋglɪʃ (sʌðən): ðə ˊθriː ˊgoʊldən ˊæplz" [English (Southern): "The Three Golden Apples"]. Textes pour nos Élèves. 2: 3–7. hdl:2027/wu.89048935472.
- Armstrong, L. E. (1923). "ɪŋglɪʃ (sʌðən): ə ˊpæsɪdʒ frəm ˊsaɪləs ˊmɑˑnə" [English (Southern): A passage from Silas Marner]. Textes pour nos Élèves. 3: iii, xi–xii. JSTOR 44704044. 44704054.
- Armstrong, L. E. (1924). "ɪŋglɪʃ (sʌðən) (2)" [English (Southern) (2)]. Textes pour nos Élèves. 4: vii–viii. JSTOR 44704100. (Note: This is an extract from The Golden Age by Kenneth Grahame, although the title does not reflect this.)
- Armstrong, L. E. (1925). "ɪŋglɪʃ: ɛkstrækt frəm *ʤɛrəmɪ baɪ *hjuː *wɔlpoʊl" [English: Extract from Jeremy by Hugh Walpole]. Textes pour nos Élèves. 5: ii–iii. JSTOR 44748576. (Note: Volume 5 was initially published in three parts with pagination resetting in each installment. Even though "Extract from Jeremy" appears in Volume 5's table of contents, this is sometimes considered to have been published in Volume 7.)
- Armstrong, L. E. (October–December 1929). "ɪŋglɪʃ: (a) prɪsaɪs trænskrɪpʃn: ɒn ˈteɪkɪŋ ə ˈhɒlədɪ (frəm "ˈwɪndfɔːlz" baɪ ˈælfə əv ðə ˈplaʊ)" [English: (a) Precise Transcription. "On Taking a Holiday" (from Windfalls by Alpha of the Plough).]. parti dez elɛːv. Le Maître Phonétique. 3rd Ser. 28: 49–50. JSTOR 44748109.

=== Discography ===
- Armstrong, L. E.; Pe Maung Tin. Texts from A Burmese Phonetic Reader (1 record). London: The Gramophone Co. No. C. 1181.
- Armstrong, L. E.; Ward, I. C. Handbook of English Intonation (3 records). Cambridge; London: W. Heffer & Sons; Linguaphone. L10; 76788-A–76793-A.
- Armstrong, L. E.; Ward, I. C.; Firth, J. R. Passages of English literature (5 records). Cambridge: W. Heffer & Sons.
- Armstrong, L. E. "Ode to the West Wind" by Shelley; "Daffodils" and "Westminster Bridge" by Wordsworth; Introduction to Endymion by Keats (2 records). Linguaphone. REP25,30.
- Armstrong, L. E. Excerpts from Mill on the Floss by Eliot (1 record). Linguaphone. REP31.
- Jones, Daniel; Firth, J. R.; Armstrong, L. E.; Members of the University College, London. English spoken here. Stuttgart: Otto Sperling. Nr. 35666 a & b; 3656 a & b.

== Bibliography ==
- Cohen, Savin (1964). "Speech Improvement for Adults: A Review of Literature and Audio-visual Materials". The Speech Teacher. 13 (3): 208–215. doi:10.1080/03634526409377372.
- Deruelle, M. (1935). "Sperlings phonothek: Praktikus-Platten". Commission Belge pour le Disque dans l'Enseignement/Belgische Commissie voor de Phonoplaat bij het Onderwijs. Revue des langues vivantes/Tijdschrift voor levende talen. 1: 101–102.
- Heirman, V. (1935). "Communication (service de presse): C. B. D. E.". Commission Belge pour le Disque dans l'Enseignement/Belgische Commissie voor de Phonoplaat bij het Onderwijs. Revue des langues vivantes/Tijdschrift voor levende talen. 1: 103–104.
- Hilson, Jane Anderson; Wheeling, Katherine Eleanor (1941). Audio-visual Materials for Junior and Senior High School Reading. New York: H. W. Wilson.
- Leslie, George Clark, ed. (1942). "American and English Phonetics". The Gramophone Shop Encyclopedia of Recorded Music. New York: Simon and Schuster. p. 545.
- MacMahon, M. K. C., ed. (2007a). "Chronological List of Publications" (PDF). Analytical Index to the Publications of the International Phonetic Association 1886–2006. University of Glasgow School of Critical Studies. pp. 32–33.
- MacMahon, M. K. C., ed. (2007b). "People — A" (PDF). Analytical Index to the Publications of the International Phonetic Association 1886–2006. University of Glasgow School of Critical Studies. pp. 32–33.
- Thonssen, Lester; Fatherson, Elizabeth; Thonssen, Dorothea, eds. (1939). Bibliography of Speech Education. New York: H. W. Wilson.
- Thonssen, Lester; Robb, Mary Margaret; Thonssen, Dorothea, eds. (1950). Bibliography of Speech Education: Supplement: 1939–1948. New York: H. W. Wilson.
- Voorhees, Lillian W.; Foster, Jacob F. (1949). "Recordings for Use in Teaching Theatre". Educational Theatre Journal. 1 (1): 48–81. JSTOR 3204109.
