= Ian Wilson (phonetician) =

Canadian linguist, born 1966

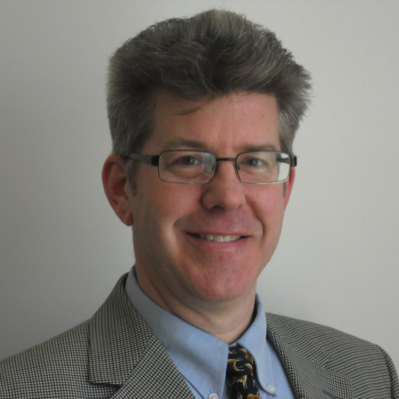
- Born: 1966 (age 59–60); Kitchener, Ontario, Canada
- Occupation: Professor

Academic background
- Education: PhD (Linguistics)
- Alma mater: University of British Columbia

Academic work
- Institutions: University of Aizu
- Main interests: Articulatory phonetics Language education Articulatory setting

Ian Wilson (born in 1966) is a Canadian linguist.

== Biography ==
Wilson has a Bachelor of Mathematics from the University of Waterloo, he has an M.A. in Teaching English as a Foreign/Second Language from the University of Birmingham and a PhD in Linguistics (phonetics) from the University of British Columbia.

He is professor at the University of Aizu in Aizuwakamatsu city, Fukushima prefecture, Japan. His field of research is phonetics, especially articulatory phonetics and articulatory setting. He is one of the first teacher/researchers to use ultrasound in a large-scale ESL classroom as a method of providing direct visual biofeedback to pronunciation learners on the movements of the tongue during speech.

Ian Wilson is a co-author of Articulatory Phonetics, which introduces students to the field of Articulatory Phonetics and Speech Science.
