= Beatrice Honikman =

Phonetician (1905–1998)

- Born: 28 September 1905; Cape Town, Cape Colony
- Died: 22 March 1998 (aged 92); Cape Town, South Africa

Academic background
- Education: University College London

Academic work
- Discipline: Phonetics
- Sub-discipline: Articulatory phonetics
- Institutions: SOAS University of London; University of Leeds
- Notable works: 'Articulatory Settings' (1964)

Beatrice Lilian Honikman (28 September 1905 – 22 March 1998) was a phonetician of South African origin who taught at SOAS University of London and the University of Leeds. Her special field was the phonetics of African languages.

== Career ==
After graduating in South Africa, she studied phonetics in the late 1920’s with Daniel Jones at University College London. She later worked as a lecturer in the School of Oriental and African Studies, London under J.R.Firth. During this period she jointly published material on the phonetics of Hausa. She undertook the major task of editing and completing The Phonetic and Tonal Structure of Kikuyu when its author, Lilias Armstrong died suddenly in 1937. The work was published in 1940. Honikman’s career continued with a lectureship in the Department of Phonetics at the University of Leeds, under the headship of P.A.D. MacCarthy, from 1955 to her retirement in 1971. Her best known publication from that period was on the topic of articulatory settings (or basis of articulation). Although she was not, and did not claim to be, the originator of this idea, her article is widely cited in discussion of articulatory settings, an area of growing interest to language teachers. She died in Cape Town in 1998.
