= Simon Boyanus =

Russian phonetician

Simon Charles Boyanus (Russian: Семён Карлович Боянус, romanized: Semyón Kárlovich Boyánus; 8 July 1871 – 19 July 1952) was a Russian phonetician who worked in England.

== Life ==
Boyanus was born in 1871 in Moscow. Simon's father was Karl Karlovich Boyanus, a famous homeopathic doctor, German by origin. Simon received his primary education at home, studying English with a tutor. He went to university at St Petersburg where he graduated from the history and philology department. After university he graduated from the State Courses of Dramatic Art in Moscow and under the pseudonym Bronevsky worked in the capital's theaters as a director and actor. In 1916 he taught English at the Women's Pedagogical Institute, from 1918 at the Second Petrograd Pedagogical Institute. From 1920, he taught courses on theater history at the State Institute of Art History. From 1923 he was an employee of the Institute for the Comparative History of Literature and Languages of the West and the East, after the liquidation of the Faculty of History and Linguistics, Leningrad State University. In 1934-1937 he was on a business trip in England, working on an edition of the English-Russian dictionary which he had compiled earlier. He never returned to the USSR. He worked at the School of Slavic Studies at the University of London. In 1942 he opened his own school of the Russian language.

Boyanus studied with the Russian linguist and lexicographer Lev Shcherba and they created the Institute of Phonetics and the Phonetic School.

In October 1923 he made a brief visit to the UK where he gave a talk about "stagery" to King's College's Shakespeare Society, but his primary objective was to study phonetics at University College, London.

Boyanus was a professor of English philology at the University of Leningrad, where he worked with Russian linguist Lev Shcherba. He came to the University College Phonetics Department again in 1925, where he spent eight months studying English phonetics under Lilias Armstrong.

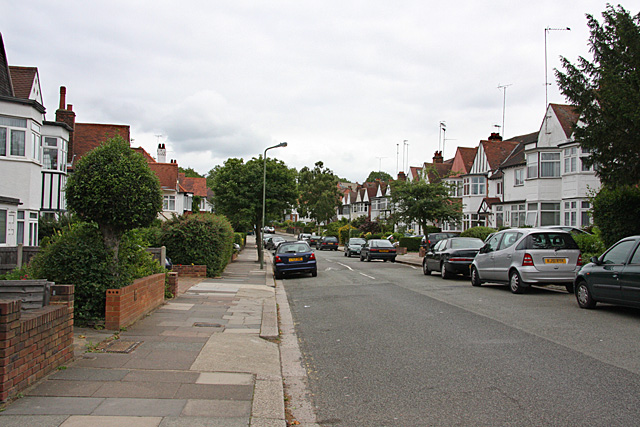
Street in Church End, Finchley, where Armstrong and Boyanus lived

He and Lilias Armstrong were married on 24 September 1926, although Lilias continued to be called "Miss Armstrong" professionally after marriage.

After his marriage, Boyanus had to return to the Soviet Union for eight years, while Armstrong had to stay in England. While away, Boyanus worked with Vladimir Müller to produce English–Russian and Russian–English dictionaries. Armstrong assisted with the phonetic transcription for the keywords in the English–Russian volume. She was able to visit Boyanus in Leningrad on two occasions, and he was able to briefly return to London in 1928. Boyanus was finally able to permanently move to England in January 1934, whereupon he became a lecturer in Russian and Phonetics at the School of Slavonic and East European Studies at the University of London.

== Selected works ==
A more complete list of works can be found in Svetozarova (2018, pp. 484–486).

- Boyanus, S. K. (1926). Postanovka angliyskogo proiznosheniya Постановка английского произношения [Basics of English pronunciation] (in Russian). Vol. 1–2. Leningrad: Sovremennik.
- Myuller, B. K.; Boyanus, S. K. (1928). Anglo–russkiy slovar Англо-русский словарь [English–Russian dictionary] (in Russian). Moskva: Sovetskaya entsiklopediya.
- Boyanus, S. K.; Myuller, B. K. (1930). Russko–angliyiskiy slovar Русско–английский словарь [Russian–English dictionary] (in Russian). Moskva: Sovetskaya entsiklopediya.
- Boyanus, S. C. (1935). A Manual of Russian Pronunciation. London: Sidgwick and Jackson.
- Boyanus, S. C.; Jopson, N. H. (1939). Spoken Russian: A Practical Course. London: Sidgick and Jackson.
- Boyanus, S. C. (1943–1947). Conversational Narratives Illustrating Spoken Russian. Vol. 1–3. London: The Boyanus School of Russian.
- Boyanus, S. C. (1955). Russian Pronunciation. London: Lund Humphries.
