= Ian Wilson (soccer) =

American soccer player and teacher

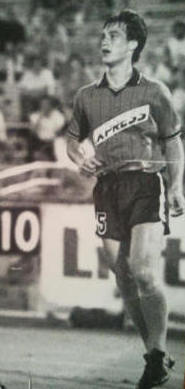

Personal information
- Date of birth: June 30, 1960 (age 66)
- Place of birth: New York, NY
- Height: 6 ft 0 in (1.83 m)
- Position: Defender

Youth career
- 1978–1981: Keene State

Senior career*
Years	Team	Apps	(Gls)
1983	Detroit Express	16	(0)
1984	Rochester Flash	22	(1)
- * Club domestic league appearances and goals

Ian Wilson (born June 30, 1960) is a former American professional soccer player and current Physical Education teacher.

== College ==
Wilson entered Keene State College, New Hampshire. During his four seasons at Keene State, he helped lead the Owls to three NAIA National Tournaments where he was named to two All-Tournament teams in 1980 and 1981. He was the captain of the 1981 Keene State team that finished 3rd in the nation. As a central defender, Wilson played and started in 93 collegiate games, scoring 18 goals and adding 14 assists. He was selected to both the NCAA and NAIA 1980 and 1981 All-American 1st teams. He was also chosen to the 1979, 1980 and 1981 All-New England teams as well as being selected to three New England All-Star Teams.

Wilson was inducted into the Keene State College Athletic Hall of Fame in 2004.

== Professional ==
After playing in New England's LASA league with Cranston Portuguese Club, Cranston, RI and Faialense Sport Club, Cambridge, MA. Wilson signed to play professionally for the 1983 Detroit Express in the American Soccer League. As a rookie, he made 16 appearances for the Express (13 as a starter). He was twice voted defensive player of the game (vs Dallas Americans and Oklahoma City Slickers). When the Detroit Express folded after the 1983 season, he was picked up by the Rochester Flash in the United Soccer League in 1984. Started 22 games for the Flash and was one of the team leaders in minutes played with 2045 mins. Selected player of the match honors in games against Buffalo Storm and Jacksonville Tea Men. Scored 1 goal and picked up 1 assist as a defender and was nominated by the Houston Dynamo to their 1984 All-Opponent team.

After the 84' season with Rochester, Wilson was to play for the Louisville Thunder in the American Indoor Soccer League but a knee injury sidelined him and eventually ended his soccer career.

== Teaching/Education ==
Physical Education Teacher

BS in Physical Education

MS in Education

== References/Links ==
- http://nasljerseys.com/ASL/Players/W/Wilson.Ian.htm
- https://keeneowls.com/honors/keene-state-college-athletics-alumni-hall-of-fame/ian-wilson/43
- https://keeneowls.com/honors/keene-state-college-athletics-alumni-hall-of-fame/1981-mens-soccer-team/63
- https://keeneowls.com/sports/2020/5/31/mens-soccer-all-americans.aspx?id=768
