= Ida C. Ward =

British linguist (1880–1949)

Ward

Ida Caroline Ward CBE (4 October 1880 – 10 October 1949) was a British linguist working mainly on African languages who did influential work in the domains of phonology and tonology. Her 1933 collaboration with Diedrich Hermann Westermann, Practical Phonetics for Students of African languages, has been reprinted many times. African languages she worked on include Efik (1933), Igbo (1936, 1941), Mende (1944), and Yoruba (published posthumously in 1952).

Born in Bradford, Ida Ward was the eighth child of a Yorkshire wool merchant. She studied for a B.Litt degree at Durham University, as a member of the then recently founded Women's Hostel, graduating in 1902. Following this she taught as a secondary school teacher for 16 years before becoming an academic. From 1919 to 1932 she worked in the phonetics department at University College London with the famous phonetician Daniel Jones; in 1932 she moved on to the School of Oriental and African Studies in London, becoming a professor in 1944. In her books on African languages she gave a detailed account of the tones of the languages, and in her day was one of the leading authorities in the subject.

== Works ==
- Ward, Ida C. (1923) Defects of Speech: Their Nature and Their Cure. E.P. Dutton.
- Armstrong, Lilias E. and Ward, Ida C. (1926) Handbook of English Intonation, B. G. Teubner, Leipzig, Germany
- Westermann, Diedrich Hermann and Ward, Ida C. (1933) Practical phonetics for students of African languages. London: Oxford University Press for the International African Institute
- Ward, Ida C. (1933) The phonetic and tonal structure of Efik. Cambridge: Heffer.
- Ward, Ida C. (1936) An introduction to the Ibo language. Cambridge: Heffer.
- Ward, Ida C. (1937) Practical suggestions for the learning of an African language in the field, Africa, supplement, vol. 10, no. 2. London.
- Ward, Ida C. (1939) The Phonetics of English. Heffer, Cambridge.
- Ward, Ida C. (1939) The Pronunciation of Twi. Heffer, Cambridge.
- Ward, Ida C. (1941) Ibo dialects and the development of a common language. Cambridge: Heffer.
- Ward, Ida C. (1944) 'A phonetic introduction to Mende', in Crosby, K.H., An introduction to the study of Mende. Cambridge: Heffer.
- Ward, Ida C. (1952) An introduction to the Yoruba language. Cambridge: Heffer & Sons.
