= Vladimir Müller =

Russian linguist and lexicographer

Vladimir Karlovich Müller (Russian: Владимир Карлович Мюллер; 24 May 1880 – c. December 1941) was a Russian linguist and lexicographer. Müller held a professorial degree and compiled the most popular English–Russian dictionary, which saw numerous reeditions (some containing about 70,000 words and expressions). Müller was also an expert on medieval dramaturgy, particularly on William Shakespeare. He published The Drama and Theatre of Shakespear's Epoch (1925) and lectured Shakespeariana to Dmitry Likhachov.

== Life ==
Müller was born in Moscow, his father was a Baltic German from Riga. Upon graduation from Moscow State University, Müller continued studies in Oxford and London. In 1918, Müller became a Professor and lectured at various institutions. He was described as "sincere opponent of German militarism" by his student and noted scholar Igor Diakonov. Around 1915 Müller married Aleksandra Petrovna Gneusheva. In the 1920s Müller wrote multiple articles on English literature for Granat Encyclopedic Dictionary, Great Soviet Encyclopedia and Literature Encyclopedia. According to Diakonov, Müller saw the cause of transition from Old English to Middle English and the loss of external grammatical flexion in the plague epidemic of the 14th century. In 1926 Müller moved with his wife to Saint Petersburg. In the following year he began working on English dictionaries, together with Semyon Boyanus.

The exact date of Müller's death is unknown. It is believed that both Vladimir Müller and his wife died during the siege of Leningrad in 1941. Müller's wife was an art scholar and worked in the National Library of Russia.
