= Ian Wilson (entrepreneur) =

British entrepreneur (1943–2020)

Ian Muir Wilson (15 November 1943 – 20 November 2020) was a British entrepreneur, writer, travel publisher, and founder and chairman of WEXAS.

== Early life and education ==
Wilson was born to Captain Robert Adam Wilson (British Army Dental Corps) and Mary Mowat Muir in Edinburgh. He was educated at Waverley School (Nottingham), Takapuna Primary School and Auckland Grammar School. With the help of several scholarships, he graduated at the University of Auckland as MA with First Class Honours in French in 1965, followed by a doctorate at Brasenose College, Oxford in French political philosophy in 1969. He has a diploma in social and physical anthropology from Auckland University (1975).

Additionally, Wilson qualified as a masseur at the Churchill Centre, as a gym instructor through the YMCA, and trained as a counselor with Regent's University London for one year and the Westminster Pastoral Foundation for two years.

Wilson has a younger brother, Stewart Graeme Wilson, who is now retired and living in New Milton, Hampshire, with his wife Hiedie and two children, Andrew and Amy, both from a prior marriage to Sangiam Khiawwilai. a Thai national.

== Career ==
While at Oxford, Wilson taught French to London University external degree students at St Clare's. After Oxford University Wilson joined JWT in 1969 as an account representative. While still in advertising, in 1970, with a Barclays bank overdraft, he founded the travel company WUNEXAS (World Universities Expeditionary Association, renamed WEXAS for World Expeditionary Association in 1972) with Alexandra Leal, later his wife. In May 1971 he left advertising to work at the association full-time and remained the chairman until his death. WEXAS was incorporated as a limited liability company in 1984, rapidly became one of the leading UK travel clubs, and later a travel company catering also to a variety of companies as a corporate travel agency.

Wilson travelled to some 130 countries during his career, partly for business and partly in pursuit of his lifetime hobby, surfing. Often he was accompanied on his adventures by his two children, Mark and Jackie. Wilson pioneered surfing in many parts of the world. From 1964 to 1968 he competed in surf competitions in New Zealand, France and Morocco, before continuing to surf as a world traveller away from competitive surfing.

== Controversies ==
Wilson was a photographer on Isis, the Oxford University magazine, from 1968 to 1969. Photographs taken by Wilson of five daughters of the Great and the Good published in Isis in 1969 proved controversial and were taken up by the Charles Greville column in the Daily Mail and later by Eamonn Andrews on the BBC Television programme What the Papers Say.

In 1982 Wilson and his son Mark visited the Cocos Keeling Islands in the Indian Ocean at a time of heightened tension between the US and the USSR as the latter sought a base to counter the Indian Ocean presence of US forces on the island of Diego Garcia in the Chagos Archipelago.

Wilson organized a commercial diving expedition to the Chagos Islands in 2005. Highly controversial in light of the political sensitivity of such a visit (albeit with the tacit approval of the Foreign and Commonwealth Office), the expedition was nearly blocked from leaving the Seychelles by the Seychelles and Mauritian prime ministers and only obtained permission to sail for Chagos after the intervention of British Foreign Secretary Jack Straw.

== Personal life ==
Married first (1974) to Alexandra Leal, a Canadian citizen and daughter of then Chanel chairman Jacques Leal. Wilson and his wife had two children, Mark Nicholas Leal (1974) and Jacqueline Emma Muir (1978). The marriage was dissolved in 1987. Wilson's second marriage (2002) was to Sarah Ann Marsh, dissolved in 2011. Wilson and his second wife had one son, Thomas Edward Mowat (2005). Wilson had joint British and New Zealand nationality and was domiciled in New Zealand, the country to which his family moved when he was nine. There are family homes in London, Dorset and New Zealand.

Wilson was granted a coat of arms by the College of Arms in 1993. He was a Fellow of the Royal Geographical Society and a member of the Chelsea Arts Club. In 1996 Wilson served as a Young Enterprise business adviser at Bryanston School, Dorset.

== Publications ==
=== Author ===
- The Influence of Hobbes and Locke in the Shaping of the Concept of Sovereignty in Eighteenth Century France (Voltaire Foundation, Geneva, 1973)
- 500 Tips and Traps for the long-haul Traveller (later renamed Trouble-Free Travel: An Insider’s Guide) (WEXAS, London, 1982, ISBN 978-0905802015) under the pen name Richard Harrington
- Black Jenny (HarperCollins, London, 1992, ISBN 978-0586091616, online)
- 500 Destinations to avoid and 500 to visit (WEXAS, London, 2000, ISBN 978-0905802107)
- 1000 Tips and Traps for the Worried Well (Osculum Press, London, 2008, ISBN 978-0905802992)
- The Little Dictionary of Big Words you should know (Fifth Floor Publishing, London, 2013, ISBN 978-0992602406)
- Essaouira: My Kind of Town, an article which appeared in The Daily Telegraph (London, 16 November 2004) about the town of Essaouira in Morocco; online.
- How to Ease the Nightmare, an article about business travel which appeared in the Financial Times (London, 9 October 2006).

=== Publisher ===
- Traveller magazine published as Expedition News (1970–1973), Expedition magazine (1973–1984), Traveller magazine (1984–present, ISSN 0262-2726)
- Off the beaten Track (A Wexas Travel handbook) (1977-1980, ISBN 978-0905064307)
- The Traveller's Handbook (1982-2008, ISBN 978-0905802176)
- Around the World in Eighty Ways (1993, ISBN 978-0905802060)
- The Traveller’s Healthbook (1998, ISBN 978-0905802091)
- The Traveller’s Internet Guide (2001, ISBN 978-0905802138)
