= Basis of articulation =

Topic in phonetics

In phonetics, the basis of articulation, also known as articulatory setting, is the default position or standard settings of a speaker's organs of articulation when ready to speak. Different languages each have their own basis of articulation, which means that native speakers will share a certain position of tongue, lips, jaw, possibly even uvula or larynx, when preparing to speak. These standard settings enable them to produce the sounds and prosody of their native language more efficiently. Beatrice Honikman suggests thinking of it in terms of having a "gear" for English, another for French, and so on depending on which language is being learned; in the classroom, when working on pronunciation, the first thing the learner must do is to think themselves into the right gear before starting on pronunciation exercises. Jenner (2001) gives a detailed account of how this idea arose and how Honikman has been credited with its invention despite a considerable history of prior study.

Different accents within a given language may have their own characteristic basis of articulation, resulting in one accent being perceived as, e.g., more 'nasal', 'velarized' or 'guttural' than another. According to Cruttenden, "The articulatory setting of a language or dialect may differ from GB [General British]. So some languages like Spanish may have a tendency to hold the tongue more forward in the mouth, while others like Russian may have a tendency to hold it further back in the mouth. Nasalization may be characteristic of many speakers of American English, while denasal voice ... is frequently said to occur in Liverpool". A more detailed exposition can be read in Gili Gaya (1956). Non-native speakers typically find the basis of articulation one of the greatest challenges in acquiring a foreign language's pronunciation. Speaking with the basis of articulation of their own native language results in a foreign accent, even if the individual sounds of the target language are produced correctly.

The term Basis of articulation is used in a slightly different sense to refer to a hypothesized articulatory "baseline" which is neutral in respect of individual vowels and consonants. This is done in the phonetic framework section of Chomsky and Halle (1968) for the purposes of explaining various distinctive features in terms of their deviation from the neutral position. More recently, Odden has written "...some features are characterized in terms of the 'neutral position' which is a configuration that the vocal tract is assumed to have immediately prior to speaking. The neutral position, approximately that of the vowel [ɛ], defines relative movement of the tongue” It is not clear if this should be taken to refer only to English.

== See also ==
- Articulatory phonetics
- Index of phonetics articles
- Manner of articulation
- Place of articulation
