= English Studies (journal) =

- Discipline: English studies
- Language: English
- Edited by: Chris Loutitt

Publication details
- History: 1919-present
- Publisher: Routledge
- Frequency: 8/year

Standard abbreviations
- ISO 4: Engl. Stud.

Indexing
- ISSN: 0013-838X (print); 1744-4217 (web)
- LCCN: a33000280
- OCLC no.: 604568017

Links
- Journal homepage; Online access; Online archive

English Studies is a peer-reviewed academic journal covering the language, literature, and culture of the English-speaking world from the Anglo-Saxon to the present day. The editor-in-chief is Chris Loutitt (Radboud University Nijmegen). The journal was established in 1919 and is published by Routledge.

== Special edition issues ==
The journal publishes each year special edition issues that contain articles on curated topics that are relevant to the English writing community.

== Abstracting and indexing ==
The journal is abstracted and indexed in the Arts and Humanities Citation Index, Linguistics and Language Behavior Abstracts, MLA International Bibliography, and Scopus.
