= The Honest Woodcutter =

One of Aesop's Fables

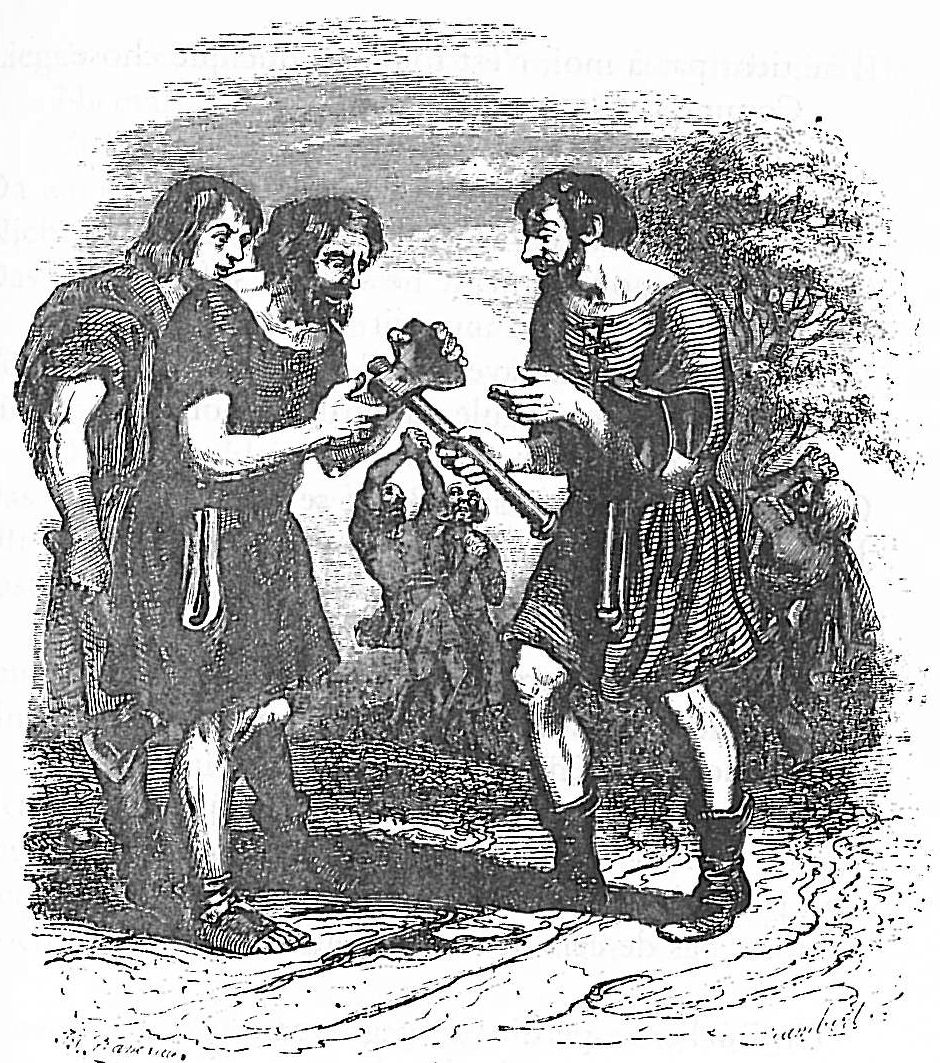
- Grandville's illustration to La Fontaine's fable

Folk tale
- Name: The Honest Woodcutter
- Also known as: Mercury and the Woodman; The Golden Axe
- Aarne–Thompson grouping: ATU 729 (The Axe falls into the Stream)
- Region: Greece; Worldwide

The Honest Woodcutter, also known as Mercury and the Woodman and The Golden Axe, is one of Aesop's Fables, numbered 173 in the Perry Index. It serves as a cautionary tale on the need for cultivating honesty, even at the price of self-interest. It is also classified as Aarne-Thompson 729: The Axe falls into the Stream.

== Story ==
The Greek version of the story tells of a woodcutter who accidentally dropped his axe into a river and, because this was his only means of livelihood, sat down and wept. Taking pity on him, the god Hermes (also known as Mercury) dived into the water and returned with a golden axe. "Was this what you had lost?", Hermes asked, but the woodcutter said it was not, and returned the same answer when a silver axe was brought to the surface. Only when his own tool is produced does he claim it. Impressed by his honesty, the god allows him to keep all three. Hearing of the man's good fortune, an envious neighbor threw his own axe into the river and wailed for its return. When Hermes appeared and offered him a golden axe, the man greedily claimed it but was denied both that and the return of his own axe.

Though the tale's moral is that 'Honesty is the best policy', as the English proverb has it, there existed a medieval Byzantine proverb apparently alluding to the fable, which stated that 'A river does not always bring axes'. But since this was glossed to mean that no person always acts consistently, it is obviously at a considerable remove from the story's application.

A burlesque retelling of the fable occurs in François Rabelais's 16th-century novel Gargantua and Pantagruel. It takes up most of the author's prologue to the 4th Book and is considerably extended in his typically prolix and circuitous style. The woodcutter's cries disturb the chief of the gods as he deliberates the world's business and he sends Mercury down with instructions to test the man with the three axes and cut off his head if he chooses wrongly. Although he survives the test and returns a rich man, the entire countryside decides to follow his example and gets decapitated. So, Rabelais concludes, it is better to be moderate in our desires. Much the same story is told in La Fontaine's Fables (V.1) but in more concentrated form. However, rather than beheading the woodman's imitators, Mercury merely administers a heavy blow.

== The fable in the arts ==
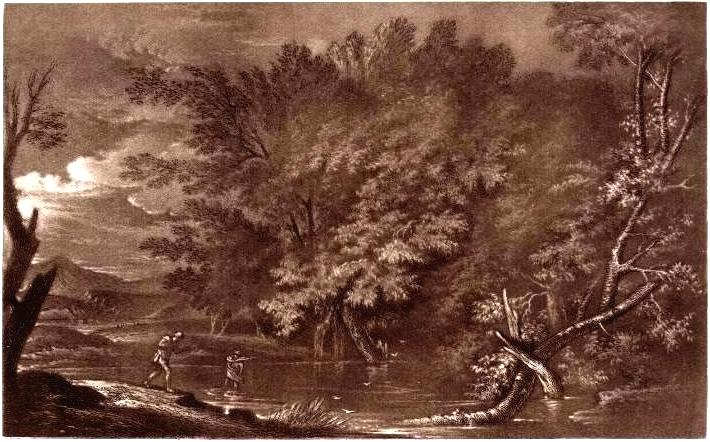
A Victorian etching of Salvator Rosa's Mercury and the dishonest woodman

Some paintings named from the fable have been broad landscapes with small figures added in the middle plane. Salvator Rosa's Mercury and the Dishonest Woodman in the National Gallery, London, dates from about 1650. An 18th-century watercolour by George Robertson (1748–88) seems to derive from this. Charles-André van Loo gives greater prominence to the figures in his Mercure présentant des haches au bûcheron in the Hôtel de Soubise. In this the god hovers in mid-air and presents the axes to the surprised and kneeling woodman.

Illustrations of the fable on English chinaware draw on the woodcut in Samuel Croxall's edition of Aesop. A Wedgwood plate of about 1775 displays a red picture in a square, garlanded frame. The rim has a wavy edge printed with detached sprays of flowers. Much the same picture as there, printed in green, is used on a contemporary Liverpool tile. In the left foreground, Mercury is presenting an axe to the seated woodman. In the distance, on the opposite bank, his dishonest neighbour has raised his axe before throwing it into the river.

In 1987 the story was included on the 40 drachma value of the eight-stamp set of Aesop's fables issued by Greece and features the naked god seated on a rock in the river and offering the three axes to the bearded woodman on the bank.

== Other versions ==
Though there are other tellings of the story, with local variations, from Nigeria, Thailand, Tibet, Finland and Japan, the main plot line in all of them is the same as in the Aesopic version, which suggests their European derivation. A certain kinship has also been observed between the fable and the account of the miraculous recovery of an axe from a river in the Jewish Bible. There the prophet Elisha caused an axe blade lost in a river to float to the surface.
