= National Register of Historic Places listings in Brookings County, South Dakota =

Location of Brookings County in South Dakota

This is a list of the National Register of Historic Places listings in Brookings County, South Dakota.

This is intended to be a complete list of the properties and districts on the National Register of Historic Places in Brookings County, South Dakota, United States. The locations of National Register properties and districts for which the latitude and longitude coordinates are included below, may be seen in a map.

There are 43 properties and districts listed on the National Register in the county. Another property was once listed but has since been removed.

This National Park Service list is complete through NPS recent listings posted October 16, 2026.

== Current listings ==
	Name on the Register	Image	Date listed	Location	City or town	Description
1	Archaeological Site 39BK0003		September 11, 2023 (#100008354)	Address Restricted	Bruce vicinity	
2	Archaeological Site 39BK0102		February 29, 2024 (#100008355)	Address Restricted	Bruce vicinity	
3	Brookings Central Residential Historic District	Brookings Central Residential Historic District	June 3, 1994 (#94000558)	Roughly bounded by 3rd St., 6th St. (Highway 14), Medary Ave., and 5th Ave.; also 521 and 601 4th St. 44°18′35″N 96°47′33″W	Brookings	4th St. addresses represent a boundary increase
4	Brookings City Hall	Brookings City Hall	June 17, 1982 (#82003914)	310 4th St. 44°18′32″N 96°47′57″W	Brookings	
5	Brookings Commercial Historic District	Brookings Commercial Historic District	April 19, 1988 (#88000029)	Roughly along Main Ave. between the former C&NW railroad line and the alley north of 5th St. 44°18′32″N 96°47′53″W	Brookings	
6	Brookings County Courthouse	Brookings County Courthouse	December 12, 1976 (#76001715)	314 6th Ave. 44°18′32″N 96°47′43″W	Brookings	
7	Brookings University Residential Historic District		February 12, 1999 (#99000210)	Roughly bounded by Harvey Dunn St., Medary Ave., 6th St., and Main Ave. 44°18′52″N 96°47′34″W	Brookings	
8	W. A. Caldwell House	W. A. Caldwell House	November 3, 1986 (#86002990)	804 6th Ave. 44°18′52″N 96°47′38″W	Brookings	
9	Carnegie Public Library	Carnegie Public Library	May 7, 1980 (#80003717)	524 4th St. 44°18′32″N 96°47′43″W	Brookings	
10	Chicago and Northwestern Railroad Depot	Chicago and Northwestern Railroad Depot	October 8, 1976 (#76001716)	111 Main St. 44°18′25″N 96°47′57″W	Brookings	
11	Ivan Cobel House	Ivan Cobel House	August 14, 2003 (#03000762)	727 Main Ave. 44°18′47″N 96°47′56″W	Brookings	
12	Coolidge Sylvan Theatre	Coolidge Sylvan Theatre	February 26, 1987 (#87000224)	912 Medary Ave. 44°18′59″N 96°47′13″W	Brookings	
13	Coughlin Campanile	Coughlin Campanile	February 26, 1987 (#87000223)	Medary Ave. 44°18′57″N 96°47′16″W	Brookings	
14	Experimental Rammed Earth Machine Shed	Experimental Rammed Earth Machine Shed	August 26, 1993 (#93000869)	Northwestern corner of the South Dakota State University campus 44°19′14″N 96°47′24″W	Brookings	
15	Experimental Rammed Earth Wall	Experimental Rammed Earth Wall	June 28, 1991 (#91000850)	1413 Medary Ave; 44°19′17″N 96°47′21″W	Brookings	
16	Fishback House	Fishback House	October 8, 1976 (#76001717)	501 8th St. 44°18′52″N 96°47′47″W	Brookings	
17	Graham House	Graham House	June 3, 1994 (#94000559)	927 7th St. 44°18′47″N 96°47′20″W	Brookings	
18	John L. Hall House	John L. Hall House	November 29, 2010 (#10000955)	121 Samara Ave. 44°19′28″N 96°55′42″W	Volga	
19	E. E. Haugen House	E. E. Haugen House	March 1, 2010 (#10000047)	202 5th St. 44°18′37″N 96°48′07″W	Brookings	
20	Henry-Martinson House	Henry-Martinson House	December 20, 1977 (#77001237)	405 Kasan Ave. 44°19′16″N 96°55′36″W	Volga	
21	Intermill House		May 9, 1997 (#97000427)	46408 203rd St. 44°26′36″N 96°55′30″W	Bruce	
22	Lockhart House	Lockhart House	November 29, 2010 (#10000954)	1001 6th Ave. 44°19′01″N 96°47′43″W	Brookings	
23	G. A. Mathews House	G. A. Mathews House	November 26, 1986 (#86002989)	423 Eighth St. 44°18′53″N 96°47′50″W	Brookings	
24	Herman F. Micheel Gothic Arched-Roof Barn	Herman F. Micheel Gothic Arched-Roof Barn	January 25, 1991 (#90002207)	19829 475th Avenue; 44°30′35″N 96°42′28″W	White	
25	Mortimer Cabin		October 26, 2017 (#100001397)	20247 Oakwood Shoreline Dr. 44°27′19″N 96°59′25″W	Bruce	
26	Nick's Hamburger Shop	Nick's Hamburger Shop	November 6, 1986 (#86003008)	427 Main Ave. 44°18′36″N 96°47′56″W	Brookings	
27	Pioneer Park Bandshell	Pioneer Park Bandshell	November 19, 2007 (#07001208)	104 6th St. West; 44°18′46″N 96°48′18″W	Brookings	
28	St. Mary's School	St. Mary's School	October 24, 1996 (#96001228)	220 E. 3rd St. 44°14′05″N 96°28′47″W	Elkton	
29	Sexauer Seed Company Historic District	Sexauer Seed Company Historic District	November 8, 2001 (#01001225)	Roughly bounded by Main Ave., the Dakota, Minnesota and Eastern railroad tracks, 2nd St., and 6th Ave. 44°18′21″N 96°47′50″W	Brookings	
30	George P. Sexauer House	George P. Sexauer House	January 26, 1990 (#89002333)	929 4th St. 44°18′33″N 96°47′18″W	Brookings	
31	Singsaas Lutheran Church	Singsaas Lutheran Church	October 23, 2003 (#03001070)	19715 487th Ave. 44°31′34″N 96°27′54″W	Lake Hendricks Township	
32	South Dakota Department of Transportation Bridge No. 06-129-020		November 30, 1999 (#99001433)	Local road over the Big Sioux River; 44°30′53″N 96°52′11″W	Bruce	Destroyed in 2011
33	South Dakota Department of Transportation Bridge No. 06-142-190	South Dakota Department of Transportation Bridge No. 06-142-190	November 30, 1999 (#99001431)	Local road over the Big Sioux River; 44°16′06″N 96°50′35″W	Brookings	
34	Sterling Methodist Church	Sterling Methodist Church	October 19, 1989 (#89001723)	20200 471st Ave; 44°27′21″N 96°47′13″W	Bruce	
35	Stock Judging Pavilion	Stock Judging Pavilion	October 19, 1978 (#78002538)	977 11th St. 44°19′08″N 96°47′18″W	Brookings	
36	Trygstad Law and Commerce Building	Trygstad Law and Commerce Building	February 23, 1984 (#84003244)	401 Main Ave. 44°18′33″N 96°47′54″W	Brookings	
37	Volga Auditorium	Volga Auditorium	July 5, 2000 (#00000723)	212 Kasan Ave. 44°19′30″N 96°55′35″W	Volga	
38	Volga Hospital	Volga Hospital	February 6, 2023 (#100008617)	203 Samara Ave. 44°19′25″N 96°55′43″W	Volga	
39	Vostad Farm	Vostad Farm	April 14, 2005 (#05000283)	2905 16th Ave., W. 44°20′30″N 96°49′46″W	Brookings	
40	Solomon Walters House	Solomon Walters House	April 26, 1978 (#78002539)	701 Railway St. 44°26′08″N 96°53′27″W	Bruce	
41	Wenona Hall and Wecota Hall	Wenona Hall and Wecota Hall	May 7, 1980 (#80003718)	Medary Ave. 44°19′04″N 96°47′20″W	Brookings	
42	Woodbine Cottage	Woodbine Cottage	January 26, 1990 (#89002332)	929 Harvey Dunn St. 44°19′05″N 96°47′18″W	Brookings	
43	Woodbine Cottage Experimental Rammed Earth Wall	Woodbine Cottage Experimental Rammed Earth Wall	June 28, 1991 (#91000849)	West of the junction of 10th St. and Medary Ave. on the South Dakota State University campus 44°19′01″N 96°47′19″W	Brookings	

== Former listing ==
	Name on the Register	Image	Date listed	Date removed	Location	City or town	Description
1	William H. and Elizabeth Beals House		June 9, 1992 (#92000685)	March 26, 2008	1302 Sixth Street	Brookings	Relocated to Volga in 2007.
2	Farmers Store		August 7, 1979 (#79002398)	February 23, 1988	Main St.	Bushnell	Destroyed by fire.
3	SDSU Extension Building		March 21, 1978 (#78002537)	December 27, 1989	Rotunda Lane	Brookings	
4	South Dakota Department of Transportation Bridge No. 06-131-040		November 30, 1999 (#99001432)	March 26, 2008	Local Rd. over Big Sioux R.	Brookings	Destroyed by overloaded truck on December 17, 2004.

== See also ==
- List of National Historic Landmarks in South Dakota
- National Register of Historic Places listings in South Dakota
