= South Dakota Highway 30 =

State highway in South Dakota, United States

Highway 30

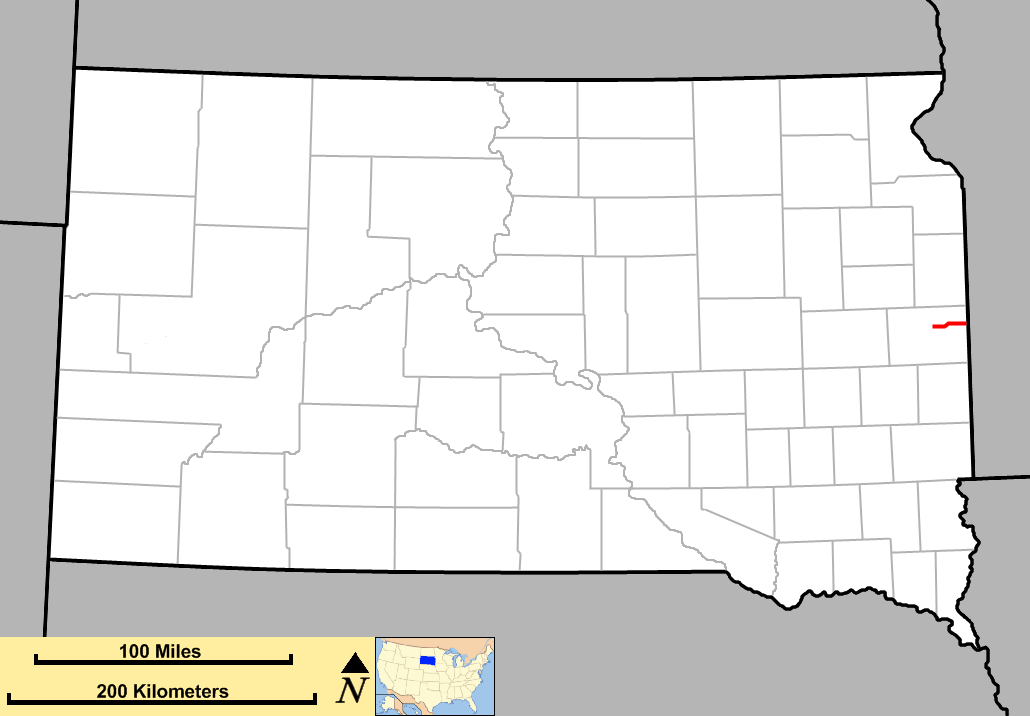
- Map of South Dakota with SD 30 in red

Route information
- Maintained by SDDOT
- Length: 17.077 mi (27.483 km)
- Existed: c. 1955–present

Major junctions
- West end: CR 6 / CR 77 west of White
- I-29 west of White
- East end: MN 19 at the Minnesota state line northeast of Bushnell

Location
- Country: United States
- State: South Dakota
- Counties: Brookings

Highway system
- South Dakota State Trunk Highway System; Interstate; US; State
← I-29	→ SD 32

South Dakota Highway 30 (SD 30) is a 17.077-mile-long (27.483 km) state highway in the east-central part of the U.S. state of South Dakota. It connects the north-central part of Brookings with the northeastern part of it.

SD 30 was established in the mid-1950s. It had two segments, which were connected by the end of the decade. However, most of the highway west of what is now Interstate 29 (I-29) was removed the next decade.

== Route description ==
SD 30 begins at an intersection with County Road 77 (CR 77; 471st Avenue) and the eastern terminus of CR 6 (204th Street) approximately 7 miles (11 km) west of White, in the north-central part of Brookings County. SD 30 takes 204th Street to the east-southeast. Just west of 472nd Avenue, it curves to the east-northeast. East of this intersection is an interchange with Interstate 29 (I-29). East of 473rd Avenue, the roadway straightens out to the east. An intersection with CR 25 (478th Avenue) leads to White. It then curves to the northeast, traveling just to the southeast of White. An intersection with 203A Street leads to the eastern part of White, as well as the city park. SD 30 curves to the east-northeast, onto 203rd Street. East of 480th Avenue, the highway curves to the east-southeast. Just east of 481st Street, it resumes its due-east direction. East of 483rd Street, the highway winds its way to the east. Jues west of the southern terminus of CR 29 (485th Avenue), it crosses over Deer Creek. This intersection leads to the Lake Hendricks Lakeside Use Area. East of this intersection, it curves back to the east. Just west of 486th Avenue, it curves to the east-northeast. Just west of CR 35 (487th Avenue), it curves back to the east. Approximately 3,300 feet (1,000 m) after this intersection, SD 30 meets its eastern terminus, an intersection with the southern terminus of 487B Avenue at the Minnesota state line, northeast of Bushnell. Here, the roadway continues to the east as Minnesota State Highway 19 (MN 19).

=== National Highway System ===
No part of SD 30 is included as part of the National Highway System, a system of routes determined to be the most important for the nation's economy, mobility and defense.

== History ==
The original SD 30 was established in 1926, and went from the Wyoming border southwest of Lead to the Minnesota border near Elkton. When the U.S. highway system was created in 1926, SD 30 was cosigned with U.S. Route 85 from Wyoming to Sturgis, with U.S. Route 16 from Sturgis to near Philip, and U.S. Route 14 from near Philip to Minnesota. The SD 30 designation was dropped in 1927.

The current SD 30 was established in the mid-1950s. At that time, it had two segments. The western segment extended from SD 25, north of De Smet, to U.S. Route 81 (US 81), south of Lake Poinsett. The eastern segment extended from US 77, west of White, to the Minnesota state line. Both segments were connected by 1960. Nearly the entire highway west of US 77, which is now I-29, was decommissioned by 1965.

== Major intersections ==
The entire route is in Brookings County.

Location	mi	km	Destinations	Notes
Sterling Township	0.000	0.000	CR 77 (471st Avenue) / CR 6 west (204th Street) – Bruce, State Park	Western terminus; eastern terminus of CR 6
Afton Township	1.500– 1.795	2.414– 2.889	I-29 – Brookings, Watertown	I-29 Exit 140
Richland Township	17.077	27.483	MN 19 east – Ivanhoe	Eastern terminus; continuation into Minnesota
1.000 mi = 1.609 km; 1.000 km = 0.621 mi
