= Lake Poinsett =

Lake Poinsett may refer to:

- Lake Poinsett (Arkansas), a lake
- Lake Poinsett (Florida), a lake
- Lake Poinsett (South Dakota), a lake
- Lake Poinsett, South Dakota, a census-designated place

== See also ==
- Poinsett (disambiguation)
