= Rolland Colony, South Dakota =

- Census-designated place
- Location within South Dakota Location within the United States
- Coordinates: 44°20′37″N 96°35′32″W
- Country: United States
- State: South Dakota
- County: Brookings

Area
  - Total: 0.24 sq mi (0.63 km^{2})
  - Land: 0.24 sq mi (0.63 km^{2})
  - Water: 0 sq mi (0.00 km^{2})
- Elevation: 1,752 ft (534 m)

Population (2020)
  - Total: 53
  - Density: 217.5/sq mi (83.97/km^{2})
- Time zone: UTC-6 (Central (CST))
  - Summer (DST): UTC-5 (CDT)
- ZIP Code: 57276 (White)
- Area code: 605
- FIPS code: 46-55684
- GNIS feature ID: 2812999

Rolland Colony is a Hutterite colony and census-designated place (CDP) in Brookings County, South Dakota, United States. It was first listed as a CDP prior to the 2020 census. The population of the CDP was 53 at the 2020 census.

It is in the eastern part of the county, 4 miles (6 km) northeast of Bushnell and 12 miles (19 km) east-northeast of Brookings, the county seat.

== Demographics ==
Historical population
Census	Pop.	Note	%±
2020	53		—
U.S. Decennial Census

== Education ==
It is in the Elkton School District 05-3.
