= Poinsett =

Poinsett most often refers to Joel Roberts Poinsett (1779-1851), American physician and diplomat, namegiver for many of the other meanings.

Poinsett may also refer to:

== Places ==
=== In the United States ===
==== Arkansas ====
- Poinsett County, Arkansas, named for Joel Roberts Poinsett
  - East Poinsett County School District
    - East Poinsett County High School
  - Lake Poinsett State Park
  - Poinsett Community Club
  - Poinsett County Courthouse
  - Poinsett Lumber and Manufacturing Company Manager's House

==== Delaware ====
- Poinsett House, a home in Kenton, Delaware, that is listed in the National Register of Historic Places

==== Florida ====
- Lake Poinsett (Florida)

==== South Carolina ====
- Poinsett Bridge, a bridge near Columbia, South Carolina, and the oldest bridge in South Carolina
- Poinsett Hotel, a hotel in Greenville, South Carolina, named for Joel Roberts Poinsett
- Poinsett State Park, a state park located in Sumter County, South Carolina, named for Joel Roberts Poinsett

==== South Dakota ====
- Lake Poinsett (South Dakota), named for Joel Roberts Poinsett
- Lake Poinsett (CDP), South Dakota

=== Outside the United States ===
- Cape Poinsett, the northern extremity of Budd Coast, Antarctica, named for Joel Roberts Poinsett

== Ships ==
- USS Poinsett (1840), a sidewheel gunboat, named for Joel Roberts Poinsett
- USS Poinsett (AK-205), launched 22 May 1944, named for Poinsett County, Arkansas

== Other ==
- Poinsettia, a plant species native to Mexico, also known as Christmas Flower, named for Joel Roberts Poinsett
