= Gothic-arch barn =

Type of barn with curved rafters

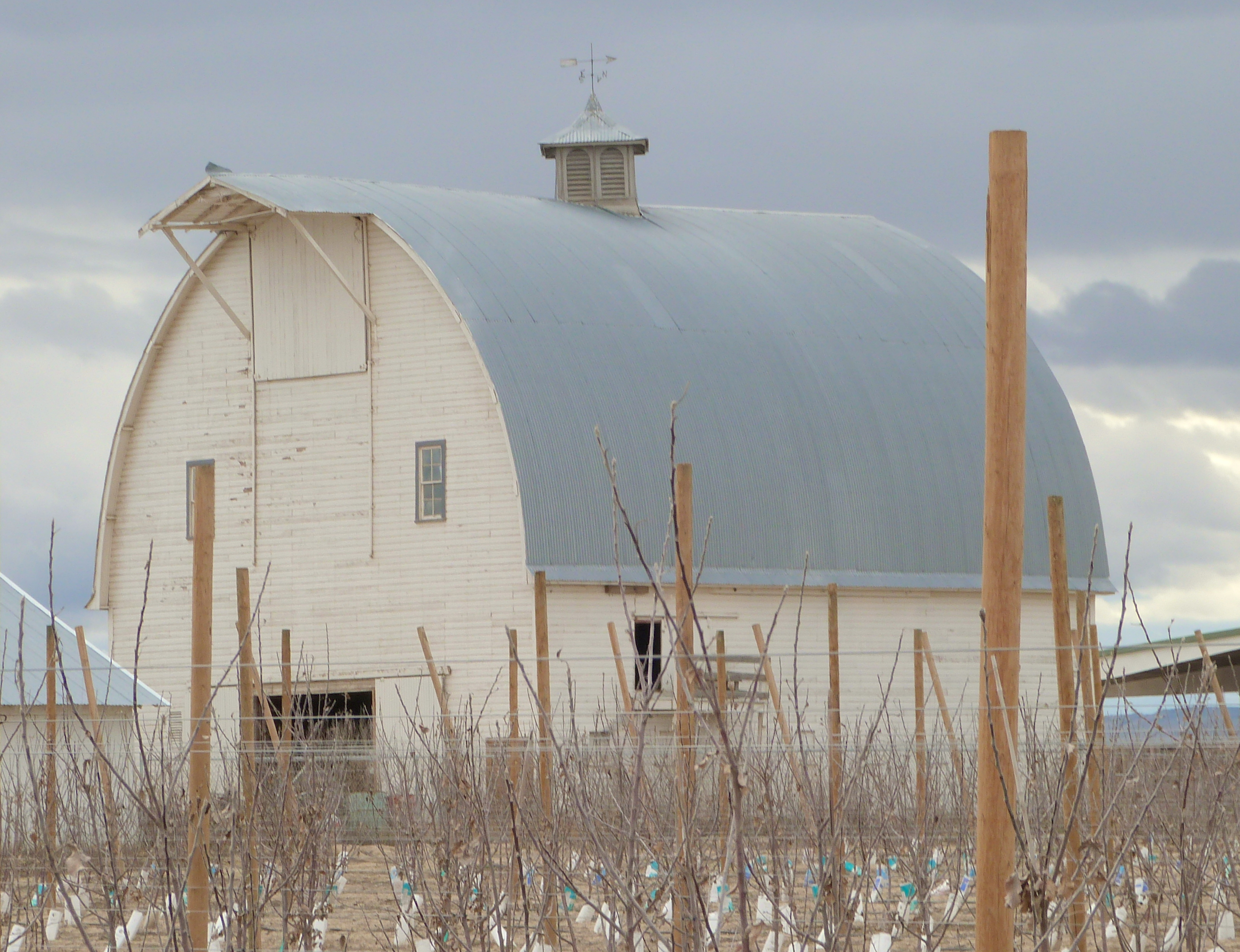
George Obendorf Gothic Arch Truss Barn, built from Sears Roebuck parts, in Idaho

A Gothic-arched roof barn or Gothic-arch barn or Gothic barn or rainbow arch is a barn whose profile is in the ogival shape of a Gothic arch. These became economically feasible when arch members could be formed by a lamination process. The distinctive roofline features a center peak as in a gable roof, but with symmetrical curved rafters instead of straight ones. The roof could extend to the ground making the roof and walls a complete arch, or be built as an arched roof on top of traditionally framed walls.

== History ==
Timber-framed barns, in use for many hundreds of years, required large timbers as posts and beams, and rafters and timber roof trusses, which consumed interior space in the structure. Also, in the United States, as settlement moved westward into areas without large stands of hardwood trees, such material became very expensive.

Gothic-arch design guide

The Gothic arch originated in Michigan in the late 19th-century; the first occurrence may have been in Isabella County in 1885. Arches were cut from boards nailed together. These early arches were not sufficiently sturdy, but did allow for structures free of heavy timbers. Advancing framing techniques for trusses made of dimensional lumber led to the gambrel roof, which was strong and free of heavy timbers. The Shawver truss—introduced in 1904 and invented by John L Shawver of Bellefontaine, Ohio—made of laminated straight boards, became a popular technique for framing gambrel roofs. This design required diagonal braces from within the roof to the floor preventing unobstructed use of both the loft and the barn.

Design of Shawver Truss, a predecessor to the Gothic-arch that provided a mostly open loft

Improvements in construction methods in the early 1900s resulted in an improved Gothic-arch truss made of longer lengths of boards bent into the curved shape. The ability to create curved laminated rafters meant that the gambrel roof evolved into the more modern Gothic-arch barn. The arch allowed for a haymow in the barn spanning the entire width without any roof supports obstructing use.

The clear span within the loft was important to minimize operating labor costs in filling the loft with stover (feed stock) for animals by using compressed air to blow the fodder into the loft. Storing loose hay was common before compact bales became an easier way to handle, transport, and store hay. As barns were prominent structures, the attractive contour of the Gothic-arch was desirable and believed to contribute to the value of a farm.

Idaho Farmer magazine predicted in 1916 that the Gothic-arch barn "would become the most prevalent construction type built on successful dairy barns." The barns became popular in the Midwestern United States in the early 1900s, and even more so in the 1910s as advances in the lamination process allowed larger rafters to be fabricated.

Barns of all kinds were available by mail order from around 1905 to the 1940s. The Gothic-arch design was featured on both the front and back cover of The Book of Barns - Honor-Bilt-Already Cut (Note: Honor-Bilt was a division of Sears that sold mail-order buildings beginning in 1908) catalog published by Sears Roebuck in 1918. It was the most popular roof design for barns sold by Sears. In 1915, Sears sold a 42-by-60-foot (13 m × 18 m) Gothic-arch barn for $1,500. All materials were pre-cut and finished and shipped by railroad to the customer for local assembly.

The popularity of arch-roofed barns peaked in the 1930s when farms transitioned from animal powered machinery to gasoline-powered tractors and large amounts of hay storage space for fodder was no longer necessary, removing the need for large haylofts. Another factor was that the concurrent availability of hay balers condensed hay by a factor of eight so that the hay that was still required could be stored in much less space. By the 1960s, large round hay bales were covered and stored on the ground, so even dairy farmers that still relied on hay did not need indoor storage space.

== Construction ==
Complete architectural plan for a Gothic-arch barn by the US Department of Agriculture

Rafters were first constructed by laminating together, by nailing, two or more pieces of 1x8 inch lumber with overlapping end joints and then cutting the desired radius. Before power tools were commonly available, this method was labor-intensive. It also wasted a considerable amount of lumber. The construction method gave way to bending rather than cutting the radius. Bent rafters were formed from 1x3 or 1x4 inch boards. Un-surfaced boards were preferred because rough-sawn boards created more friction when laminated. For barns up to 30 feet (9.1 m) wide, rafters were commonly made from four pieces of 1x3 (actually 3/4 inches thick) random length boards with end joints of at least two feet apart nailed together and also bolted every three feet. Larger barns required stronger rafters, such as five pieces of 1x4.

Later arched rafters were formed without nails or bolts; the multiple layers were glued together with a waterproof casein glue under pressure. Such assemblies approached the strength of solid timbers.

Manufactured glued laminated wooden arches were first seen in the United States in 1934, offered by Unit Structures Inc. of Peshtigo, Wisconsin. Other early manufacturers were Rilco Laminated Products of St. Paul, Minnesota, a subsidiary of Weyerhaeuser Lumber Company; and Super Structures, also in Minnesota. World War II shortages of steel increased interest in structural laminated timber.

Rilco produced Gothic-arches for farm buildings advertised as “factory-fabricated and engineered”, and were sold in lumber yards in standard sizes for 30–40-foot (9.1–12.2 m) wide barns. The arches were shipped in two pieces with pre-drilled holes and assembly hardware.

The Tomlinson Lumber Co sold pre-cut materials for a 34 by 50 feet (10 m × 15 m) dairy barn with a Gothic-arched roof supported by three-ply rafters in 1958 throughout Minnesota.

The first published plans by an architect for a Gothic-arch barn appeared in 1916.

Although the technique was generally outdated at the time, a guide to making a Gothic-arch truss cut from straight 1x8 was published by the USDA Forest Products Lab in 1958.

== Kootenai River valley ==
A late 1930s government program in northern Idaho relocated destitute farmers that had originally homesteaded on marginally productive land. The Boundary Farms Project, run by the Farm Security Administration's Rural Resettlement Project built 37 100-acre (40 ha) farms in the Kootenai River valley. Each farm typically included of one or two Gothic-arch or Gambrel-roof barns. Today, these barns provide the most historic connection to the Depression-era project. One farm is now located within the Kootenai National Wildlife Refuge and its original Gothic-arch barn, eligible for listing on the National Register of Historic Places, is used in the headquarters complex as a classroom.

== Wells Barn ==
An 1889 patent by contractor John Talcott Wells of Garbutt, New York for his Wells Truss System described a hybrid structure with the gambrel-roof form on the outside but Gothic-arches on the inside creating a completely unobstructed interior. Over 200 such barns were built in 1886-1942 by Wells and his sons, mostly in Western New York. This design utilized a unique truss with the lower chord Gothic-arch-shaped. Two Wells barns are located on the NRHP-listed Isaac Cox Cobblestone Farmstead.

== Notable examples ==
- State Soldiers Home Barn (1929) in Hot Springs, South Dakota.
- George Obendorf Gothic Arch Truss Barn (1919) in Canyon County, Idaho
- Beamer Barn (1924), in Gove County, Kansas
- Herman F. Micheel Gothic Arched-Roof Barn (1920), in White, South Dakota
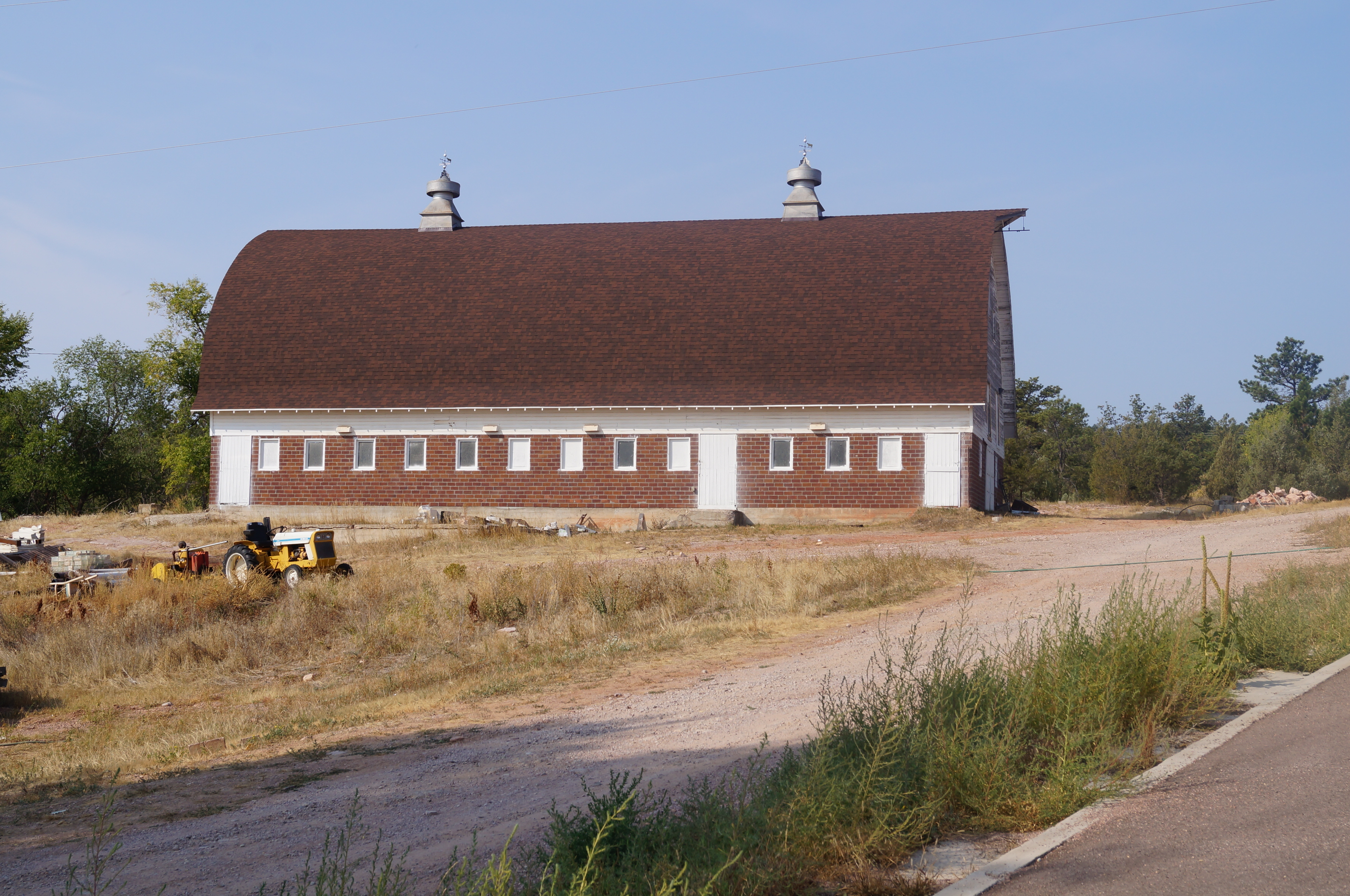
State Soldiers Home Barn

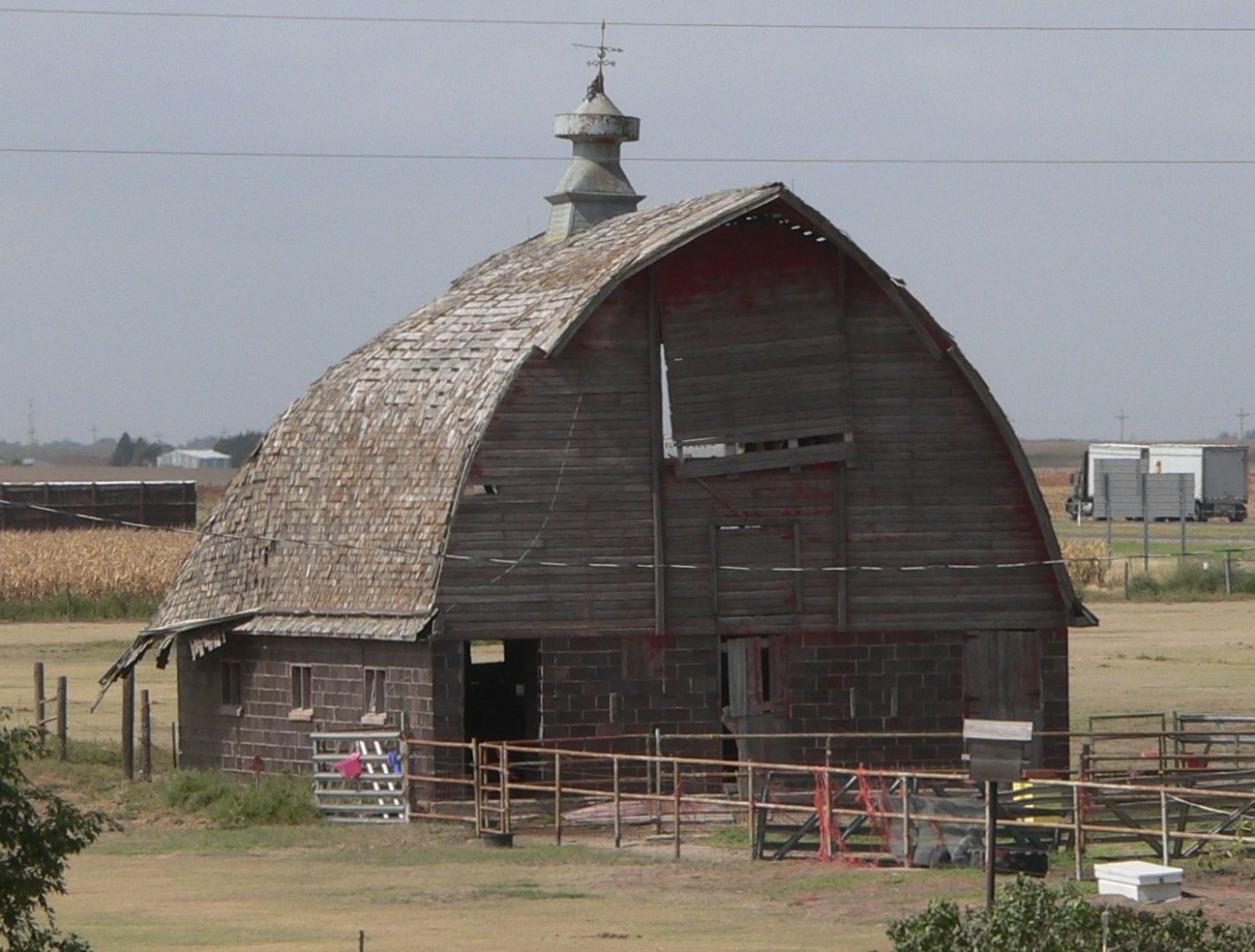
Beamer Barn

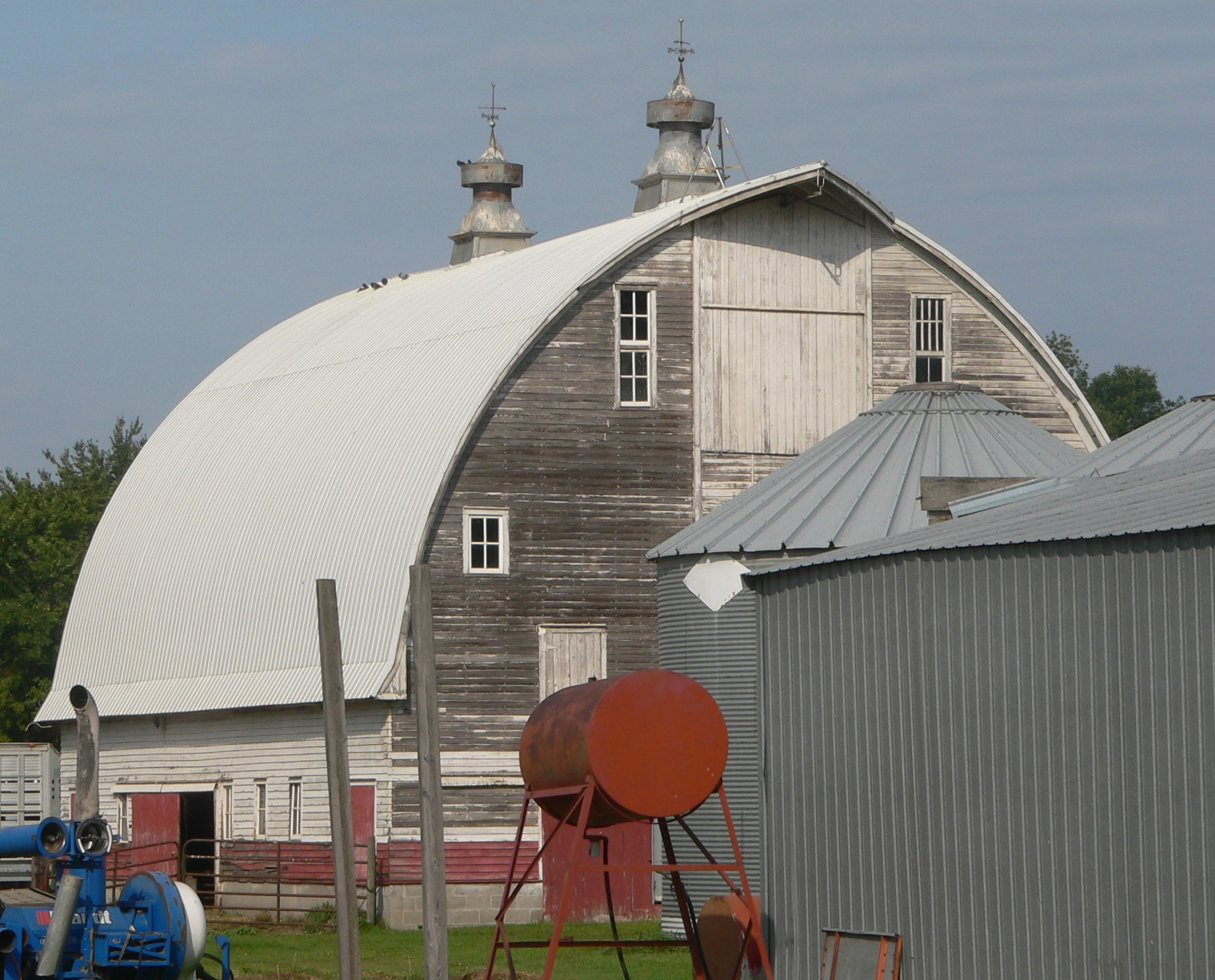
Herman F. Micheel Barn

== See also ==
- American historic carpentry
