= Arlington Municipal Airport =

Arlington Municipal Airport may refer to:

- Arlington Municipal Airport (Oregon) in Arlington, Oregon, United States (FAA: 1S8)
- Arlington Municipal Airport (South Dakota) in Arlington, South Dakota, United States (FAA: 3A9)
- Arlington Municipal Airport (Tennessee), a former airport in Arlington, Tennessee, United States (FAA: LHC)
- Arlington Municipal Airport (Texas) in Arlington, Texas, United States (FAA: GKY)
- Arlington Municipal Airport (Washington) in Arlington, Washington, United States (FAA: AWO)
