= Norfeld Colony, South Dakota =

- Census-designated place
- Location within South Dakota Location within the United States
- Coordinates: 44°25′24″N 96°33′22″W
- Country: United States
- State: South Dakota
- County: Brookings

Area
  - Total: 0.50 sq mi (1.29 km^{2})
  - Land: 0.50 sq mi (1.29 km^{2})
  - Water: 0 sq mi (0.00 km^{2})
- Elevation: 1,936 ft (590 m)

Population (2020)
  - Total: 9
  - Density: 18.1/sq mi (6.98/km^{2})
- Time zone: UTC-6 (Central (CST))
  - Summer (DST): UTC-5 (CDT)
- ZIP Code: 57276 (White)
- Area code: 605
- FIPS code: 46-45390
- GNIS feature ID: 2807095

Norfeld Colony is a Hutterite colony and census-designated place (CDP) in Brookings County, South Dakota, United States. It was first listed as a CDP prior to the 2020 census. The population of the CDP was 9 at the 2020 census.

It is in the northeast part of the county, 5 miles (8 km) east of White and 19 miles (31 km) northeast of Brookings, the county seat.

== Demographics ==
Historical population
| Census | Pop. | Note | %± |
|---|---|---|---|
| 2020 | 9 | | — |
U.S. Decennial Census

== Education ==
It is in the Deubrook School District 05-6.
