= Medary, South Dakota =

- unincorporated community
- Location of Medary in South Dakota
- Coordinates: 44°12′35″N 96°47′11″W
- Country: United States
- State: South Dakota
- County: Brookings
- Township: Medary
- Founded: 1857
- Founder: Dakota Land Company
- Named for: Samuel Medary
- Elevation: 1,575 ft (480 m)
- Time zone: UTC-6 (Central Time Zone (CST))
  - Summer (DST): UTC-5 (CDT)
- ZIP code: 57006
- Area code: 605
- GNIS feature ID: 1261042

Medary is an unincorporated community in Brookings County, South Dakota, United States. Founded in 1857 by the Dakota Land Company, it was one of the first towns in South Dakota. It is not tracked by the U.S. Census Bureau.

== History ==
=== Early history ===
The earliest signs of human activity found in the area date back to 1500 B.C., evidenced through ancient stone artifacts belonging to many different Native American peoples, as well as several burial mounds found in the area. Popular places for early Indian settlements in the county were along the county's many lakes, including the Oakwood Lakes and Lake Campbell; and the Big Sioux River. Sioux Indian tribes later settled the area. The buffalo, elk, and deer herds in the area were important parts of Native American and pioneer life. The area had been traveled by missionaries, explorers, merchants and trappers as early as 1750. The first recorded white man to visit what later became Brookings County was fur-trader Joseph LaFramboise. LaFramboise established a trading post near Flandreau, running it from 1822 to 1827.

=== Founding and settlement ===
Medary was the first official town in Brookings County and was one of the first three settlements in South Dakota, along with Flandreau and Sioux Falls. It was named for Governor Samuel Medary of Minnesota Territory. Medary was located and founded in May 1857 by the Dakota Land Company of St. Paul, Minnesota, which was headed by Major Franklin J. DeWitt and Alpheus G. Fuller. On the expedition to locate the claim, the men were joined by engineer Samuel A. Medary, Jr. They became the first residents of the town, staying there for the winter. In early 1858, other settlers began to move to the townsite. However, in June 1858, the settlers were driven away by Yankton and Yanktonnia Indians. Medary was abandoned until 1869, when 10 Norwegian settlers traveled from the east and resettled Medary at a location just north of the old townsite. On July 3, 1871, Brookings County was organized in Martin Trygstad's cabin in Medary. The line originally extended to about 2 miles south of Flandreau. The county lines were redrawn by the territorial legislature on January 8, 1873, where they remain today. The first post office in Brookings County was established in 1871 with Trygstad as postmaster. Medary was also the location of the first school sessions in Brookings County, which were held in volunteers' homes. Medary was the first county seat of Brookings County for a total of eight years, from 1871 to 1879.

=== Later history and today ===
Medary and the nearby towns of Oakwood and Fountain each hoped that the incoming railroad would decide to go through their town, but they were all bypassed. Instead, the businessmen of Medary and Fountain collaborated and decided to build a town along the planned path of the tracks, which later became Brookings in October 1879. Other towns that sprang up along the railroad were Aurora and Volga. Several businesses moved from Medary and Fountain to Brookings. The town of Medary has become largely abandoned.

A monument was built on the old site of Medary to commemorate the town's existence at the old site, located at the intersection of 471st Avenue (Brookings County Road 77) and 219th Street (Brookings County Road 22).

== Geography ==
Medary is located in Brookings County, approximately 4.5 miles south of Brookings. The Big Sioux River is located nearby.

=== Climate ===
Climate data for Medary, South Dakota
Month	Jan	Feb	Mar	Apr	May	Jun	Jul	Aug	Sep	Oct	Nov	Dec	Year
Record high °F (°C)	65 (18)	69 (21)	85 (29)	93 (34)	106 (41)	105 (41)	109 (43)	106 (41)	102 (39)	93 (34)	77 (25)	68 (20)	109 (43)
Mean daily maximum °F (°C)	23 (−5)	28 (−2)	39 (4)	55 (13)	68 (20)	77 (25)	82 (28)	80 (27)	71 (22)	58 (14)	40 (4)	26 (−3)	54 (12)
Daily mean °F (°C)	13 (−11)	18 (−8)	30 (−1)	44 (7)	57 (14)	66 (19)	71 (22)	69 (21)	59 (15)	46 (8)	31 (−1)	17 (−8)	43 (6)
Mean daily minimum °F (°C)	3 (−16)	8 (−13)	21 (−6)	33 (1)	45 (7)	55 (13)	59 (15)	57 (14)	47 (8)	34 (1)	21 (−6)	8 (−13)	33 (0)
Record low °F (°C)	−41 (−41)	−41 (−41)	−23 (−31)	−2 (−19)	7 (−14)	28 (−2)	37 (3)	28 (−2)	12 (−11)	−9 (−23)	−22 (−30)	−36 (−38)	−41 (−41)
Average precipitation inches (mm)	0.35 (8.9)	0.43 (11)	1.16 (29)	2.13 (54)	2.97 (75)	4.30 (109)	3.25 (83)	3.07 (78)	3.19 (81)	2.05 (52)	0.95 (24)	0.48 (12)	24.33 (616.9)
Source: The Weather Channel (Historical Monthly Averages)

== See also ==
- Dakota Territory
