= VeraSun Energy =

American energy company

VeraSun Energy Corporation was a leading producer of renewable fuel. The company at one time had a fleet of 16 production facilities in eight states, of which one was still under construction. VeraSun Energy was scheduled to have an annual production capacity of approximately 1.64 billion US gallons (6,200,000 m^{3}) of ethanol and more than 5 million tons of distillers grains by the end of 2008. The company also had begun construction at its Aurora, South Dakota facility to extract oil from dried distillers grains, a co-product of the ethanol process, for use in biodiesel production.

VeraSun marketed E85, a blend of 85 percent ethanol and 15 percent gasoline for use in Flexible fuel vehicles (FFVs), directly to fuel retailers under the brand VE85. VeraSun Energy at one time had approximately 150 VE85 retail locations under contract in more than fifteen states and Washington, D.C.

== History ==
VeraSun Energy was founded in 2001 with the goal of providing a renewable, home-grown energy source while boosting domestic rural economy and creating a future that includes renewable energy to help benefit the environment and reduce the nation's demand for foreign oil.

The company has been credited for a number of "industry firsts" – the first 100-million-US-gallon (380,000 m^{3})-per-year dry-grind production facility, the country's first branded E85, VE85; the first ethanol producer to form strategic alliances with Ford Motor Company, General Motors, Enterprise Rent-A-Car and Kroger to increase awareness and availability of E85, and the first company to place an E85 retail station in the Washington D.C. metro area.

VeraSun began producing ethanol in December 2003 when its Aurora, S.D., production facility came on-line. Less than two years later, Fort Dodge, Iowa, became the second facility of the company to begin production, increasing the company's production capacity to more than 200 million US gallons (760,000 m^{3}) per year. Not stopping with two facilities, VeraSun began other greenfield site developments in Iowa at Charles City and Hartley, in addition to a third location in Welcome, Minnesota. A fourth greenfield location was under development and halted prior to construction in Reynolds, Indiana – also referred to as BioTown USA. VeraSun Charles City began operation in April 2007, three months ahead of schedule.

On June 14, 2006, VeraSun became the first "pure play" ethanol producer to take its stock public when it listed on the New York Stock Exchange (NYSE). The public listing was the first of several major announcements for the company over the next 18 months. In July 2007, VeraSun announced the first major acquisition in the industry when the company purchased three 110 million US gallons (420,000 m^{3}) per year production facilities from ASAlliances Biofuels, LLC. The facilities, located in Linden, Indiana; Albion, Nebraska, and Bloomingburg, Ohio, doubled the company's production capacity to more than 650 million US gallons (2,500,000 m^{3}) per year .

VeraSun's second major acquisition came less than five months later when it was announced that VeraSun and US BioEnergy would merge, creating a company with 16 biorefineries and a production capacity by the end of 2008 of more than 1.6 billion US gallons (6,100,000 m^{3}) per year. The merger closed on April 1, 2008 and VeraSun was positioned as the largest ethanol producer in the United States with plants located in eight different states.

Less than a year later, VeraSun filed for bankruptcy.

== Biorefinery locations ==
VeraSun Energy had a fleet of 16 production facilities in eight states. They are listed below in alphabetical order.

Albert City, Iowa
Capacity: 110 million US gallons (420,000 m^{3}) per year
Start-Up: December 2006

Albion, Nebraska
Capacity: 110 million US gallons (420,000 m^{3}) per year
Start-Up: October 2007

Aurora, South Dakota
Capacity: 120 million US gallons (450,000 m^{3}) per year
Start-Up: December 2003

Bloomingburg, Ohio
Capacity: 110 million US gallons (420,000 m^{3}) per year
Start-Up: March 2008

Central City, Nebraska
Capacity: 100 million US gallons (380,000 m^{3}) per year
Start-Up: April 2004

Charles City, Iowa
Capacity: 110 million US gallons (420,000 m^{3}) per year
Start-Up: April 2007

Dyersville, Iowa
Capacity: 110 million US gallons (420,000 m^{3}) per year
Start-Up: September 2008

Fort Dodge, Iowa
Capacity: 110 million US gallons (420,000 m^{3}) per year
Start-Up: October 2005

Hankinson, North Dakota
Capacity: 110 million US gallons (420,000 m^{3}) per year
Start-Up: July 2008

Hartley, Iowa
Capacity: 110 million US gallons (420,000 m^{3}) per year
Start-Up: August 2008

Janesville, Minnesota
Capacity: 110 million US gallons (420,000 m^{3}) per year
Projected Start-Up: Q4 2008

Linden, Indiana
Capacity: 110 million US gallons (420,000 m^{3}) per year
Start-Up: August 2007

Marion, South Dakota
Capacity: 110 million US gallons (420,000 m^{3}) per year
Start-Up: February 2008

Ord, Nebraska
Capacity: 50 million US gallons (190,000 m^{3}) per year
Start-Up: May 2007

Welcome, Minnesota
Capacity: 110 million US gallons (420,000 m^{3}) per year
Construction Complete: June 2008

Woodbury, Michigan
Capacity: 50 million US gallons (190,000 m^{3}) per year
Start-Up: September 2006
The Woodbury plant was sold in May, 2009 to Carbon Green LLC.

== Bankruptcy ==
As of October 31, 2008, VeraSun and twenty-four of its subsidiaries have filed for Chapter 11 bankruptcy protection to enhance liquidity while it reorganizes. The Sioux Falls-based company says the move was voluntary in order to maintain business as usual. South Dakota Senator John Thune says he is hopeful VeraSun Energy will emerge a stronger company after the chapter 11 filing.

VeraSun's financial difficulties were the result of the company's hedging its corn consumption, with an OTC derivative known as an accumulator. The derivative contract works as such: VeraSun locks in their procurement of corn at a discount to current market prices. However, if the market moves below this discounted level, then VeraSun was required to take in twice as much as it was normally contracted to. This results in VeraSun taking twice as much grain as they need at a higher price than if they bought on the open market. More over, these accumulators typically have a stipulation where if the price of corn were to rise too high relative to the discounted level, then the contract would knock out and no longer be in effect. Every week these conditions are checked and the appropriate amount of corn is purchased by VeraSun at the appropriate price. What happened to VeraSun was that, the price of corn fell drastically, which caused them to buy twice as much corn as they need at what was then a relatively high price. On top of this, the price of ethanol fell as well, which caused their crushing margin to go negative.

VeraSun ended up selling seven of its plants to Valero Energy Corporation, and the rest to other companies in 2009.
