= Herman F. Micheel Gothic Arched-Roof Barn =

- Micheel, Herman F., Gothic Arched-Roof Barn
- U.S. National Register of Historic Places
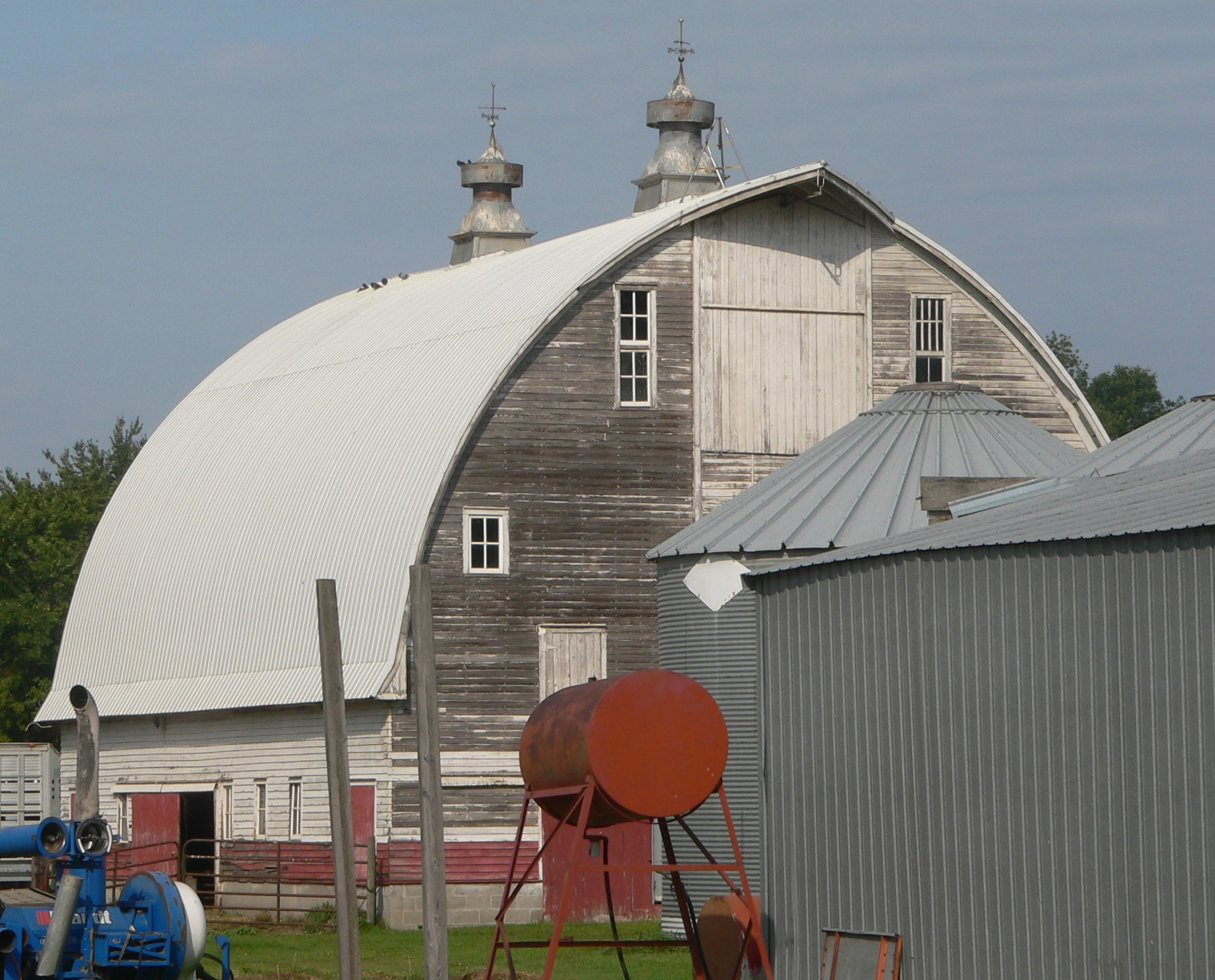

- Location within South Dakota Location within the United States
- Nearest city: White, South Dakota
- Coordinates: 44°30′35″N 96°42′27″W
- Area: less than one acre
- Built: 1920
- Built by: Wulbers, Henry
- Architectural style: Gothic arched-roof barn
- NRHP reference No.: 90002207
- Added to NRHP: January 25, 1991

The Herman F. Micheel Gothic Arched-Roof Barn, in Brookings County, South Dakota, is a Gothic-arch barn built in 1920. It was listed on the National Register of Historic Places in 1991. It is located 5 miles north and 3 miles west of White, South Dakota.

It was built for Herman Friedrich Micheel, a farmer who was born in 1873 near Rollingstone, Minnesota, and who built a house and barn on this property in about 1900. In 1920 the original barn was demolished and replaced. Local carpenter Henry Wulbers supervised several others in preparing the materials before the barn was raised. A "shingling bee" was organized to cover the curved roof of the barn with cedar shingles all in one day.
