= George Obendorf Gothic Arch Truss Barn =

- U.S. National Register of Historic Places
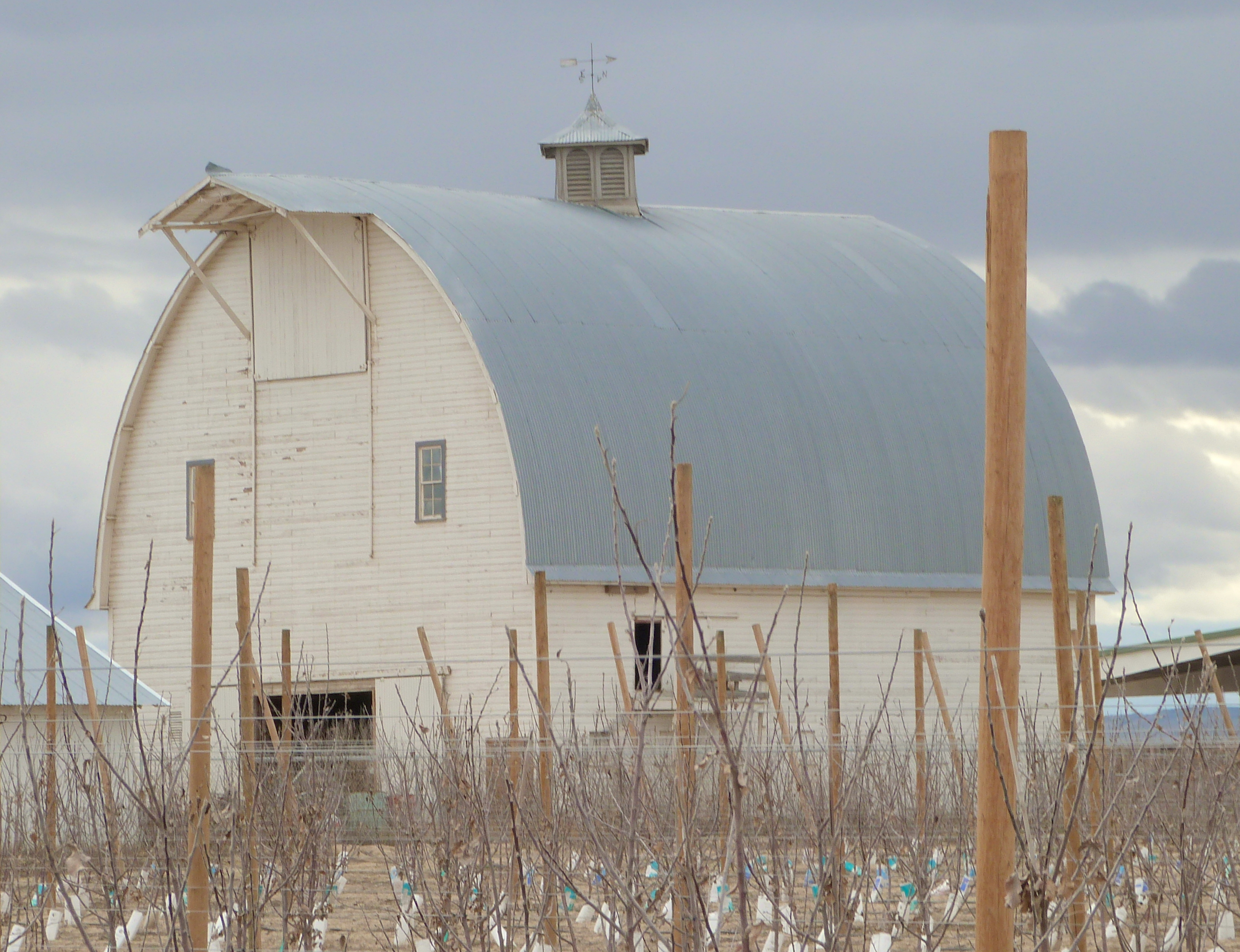
- Location: 24047 Batt Corner Rd., Canyon County, Idaho, near Wilder
- Coordinates: 43°43′14″N 116°55′23″W
- Area: less than one acre
- Built: 1915
- Architect: Sears, Roebuck & Co.
- Architectural style: Gothic Art Truss Barn
- NRHP reference No.: 99001278
- Added to NRHP: October 28, 1999

The George Obendorf Gothic Arch Truss Barn is a Gothic-arch barn built in 1915 from a Sears, Roebuck & Co. kit. It was listed on the National Register of Historic Places in 1999.

It is located at the rear of the George Obendorf farm complex in Canyon County, Idaho about 6 miles (9.7 km) north of Wilder.

It is 42 by 60 feet (13 m × 18 m) in plan and rests on a concrete foundation. Its components were pre-manufactured by Sears, Roebuck & Co., shipped to Wilder, and assembled by local carpenters and the Obendorf family.
