= Beamer Barn =

- U.S. National Register of Historic Places
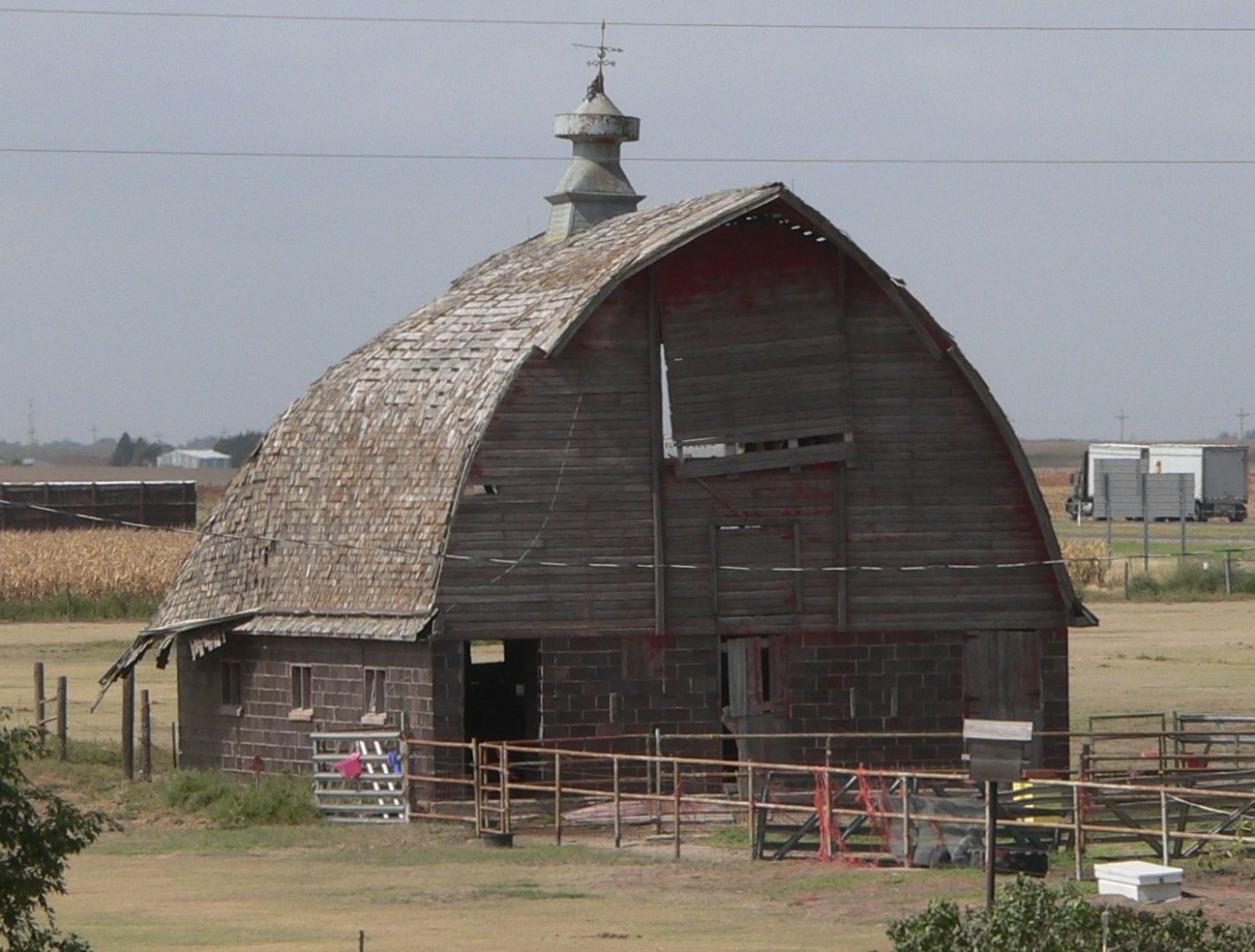
- Barn in 2014

- Location within Kansas Location within the United States
- Location: 2931 CR 18, Oakley
- Coordinates: 39°06′40″N 100°44′25″W
- Built: 1923–24
- Architectural style: Gothic arch barn
- MPS: Agriculture-Related Resources of Kansas MPS
- NRHP reference No.: 10000452
- Added to NRHP: July 8, 2010

The Beamer Barn in Gove County, Kansas, near Oakley, is a Gothic-arch barn which was listed on the United States National Register of Historic Places in 2010.

It was built during 1923–24 by farmer Ross Beamer and his brother-in-law Ross Gallion to replace a previous barn which had burned. The first floor is built of ceramic blocks on a concrete foundation.

A 2012 visitor informally reported on condition of the barn, which is on private property:

Oakley's historic Beamer Barn needs a benefactor! It's lost most of its shingles and has many other issues, but is still home to this pinto and several others. This dutch gambrel style roof and even this very style of cupola-thingy is ubiquitous in this area, which according to a local was home to many German and other nationalities of Catholics in the last couple centuries. I was pleasantly surprised to find a church or even cathedral in many towns, and 66 loves her some cemeteries of old! The horse pictured took three bites out of Monica after trying to star in my video. He's a self-centered pain in the arse and is being sent elsewhere (according to farmer Tom Sharp who graciously let us into the paddock so we could get close to his historic barn).

Photos from 2014 show one end wall of the loft is missing and it is in overall poor condition:

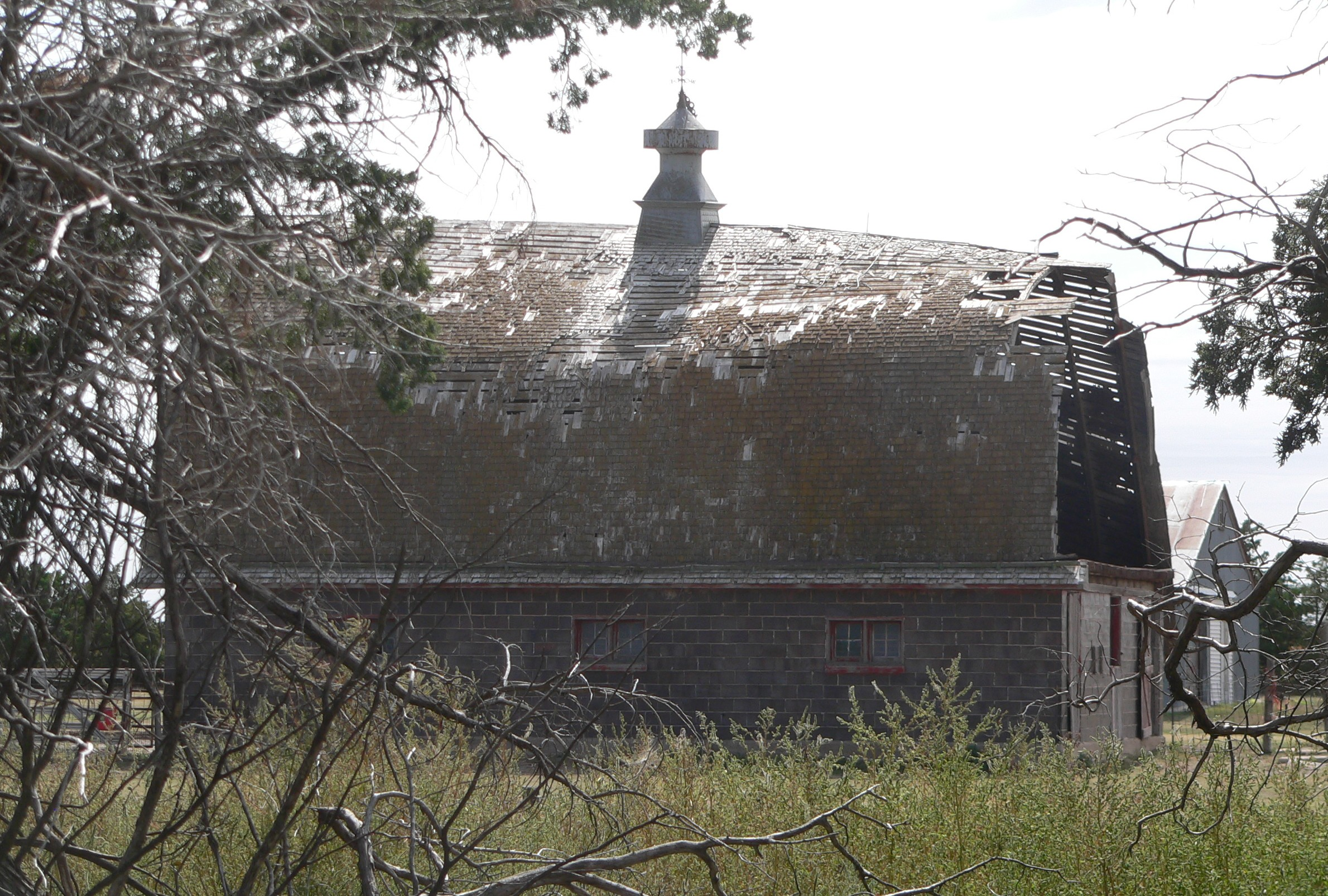
Photo from north in 2014

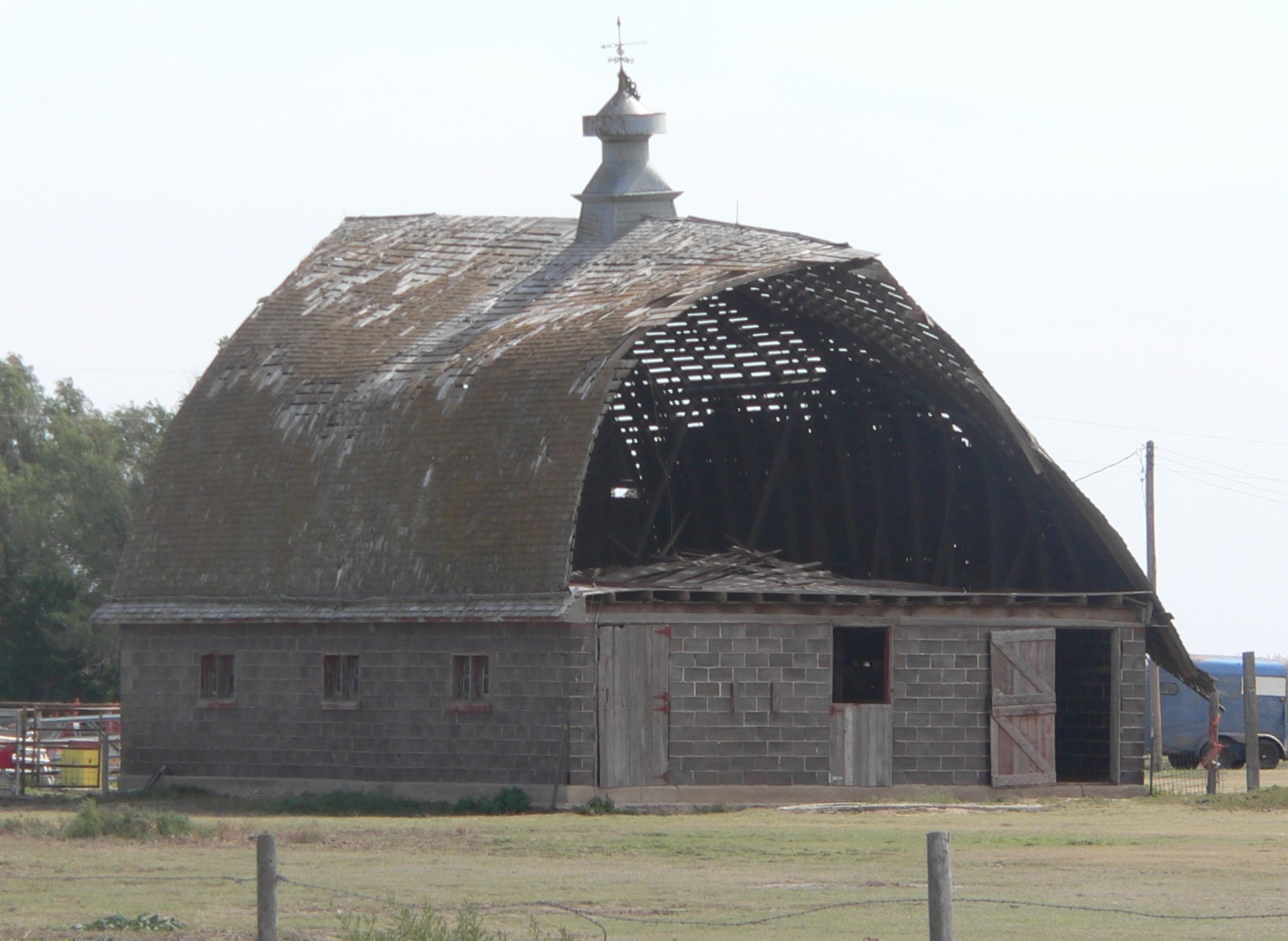
Photo from northwest in 2014
