= McKnight Foundation =

American philanthropic organization

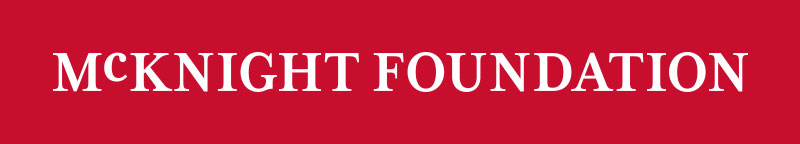
- Formation: 1953; 73 years ago
- Founder: William L. McKnight and Maude L. McKnight
- Legal status: 501(c)(3) organisation
- Location: Minneapolis, Minnesota
- Region served: Worldwide
- Key people: Tonya Allen, President;
- Endowment: $2.5 billion USD
- Website: https://www.mcknight.org/

The McKnight Foundation is an American Minnesota-based family foundation. Established in 1953, the McKnight Foundation maintains a $2.5 billion endowment, which it distributes in grants. In 2022, the foundation issued $120 million, supporting Minnesota cultural institutions, climate change efforts, and social justice initiatives, among other goals.

== History ==
The McKnight Foundation was founded in 1953 by William L. McKnight, an early leader of the 3M Corporation, and Maude L. McKnight, and was independently endowed by the McKnight's. Bolstered by their estates, the foundation's assets grew substantially in the 1980s.
