= William L. McKnight =

American businessman (1887–1978)

- Born: November 11, 1887; White, South Dakota, U.S.
- Died: March 4, 1978 (aged 90)
- Known for: Founding The McKnight Foundation in 1953 and being its chairman of the board.
- Spouse: Maude L. McKnight

William L. McKnight (November 11, 1887 – March 4, 1978) was an American businessman and philanthropist who served his entire career in the 3M corporation, rising to chairman of the board from 1949 to 1966. He founded the McKnight Foundation in 1953.

== Biography ==
William L. McKnight was the third child born to homesteaders Joseph and Cordelia McKnight, who left the East in 1880 to claim a homestead in South Dakota. William was born in the family's sod house in White, South Dakota.

McKnight attended Duluth Business University, and after attending school for only 4 months of the 6-month program, began working for 3M Corporation as an Assistant Bookkeeper in May 1907, at a salary of $11.55 per week. McKnight began to understand the dire financial situation of 3M, and his ideas for making better products and cutting costs gained the admiration of the general manager, who promoted McKnight to cost accountant. Two years after that, he was placed in charge of the company's Chicago office.

In 1914, McKnight was promoted to general manager of 3M and moved to the company's headquarters in St. Paul. In June 1916 McKnight became 3M's vice president at age 29. Soon afterwards, Edgar Ober, the company's president, became ill, leaving McKnight running 3M - he officially became president in August 1929. He served as president until 1949, as chairman of the board from 1949 to 1966, and as honorary chairman of the board until 1972.

McKnight's business sense and emphasis on research and development helped bring 3M back from the brink of bankruptcy and turn it into the large, multinational corporation.

McKnight was inducted into the Junior Achievement U.S. Business Hall of Fame in 1995.

== Business philosophy ==
McKnight encouraged 3M management to delegate responsibility and encourage men and women to exercise their initiative and his management theories are still the guiding principles for 3M.

Many believe McKnight's greatest contribution was as a business philosopher since he created a corporate culture that encourages employee initiative and innovation. His basic rule of management was laid out in 1948:

As our business grows, it becomes increasingly necessary to delegate responsibility and to encourage men and women to exercise their initiative. This requires considerable tolerance. Those men and women, to whom we delegate authority and responsibility, if they are good people, are going to want to do their jobs in their own way. Mistakes will be made. But if a person is essentially right, the mistakes he or she makes are not as serious in the long run as the mistakes management will make if it undertakes to tell those in authority exactly how they must do their jobs. Management that is destructively critical when mistakes are made kills initiative. And it is essential that we have many people with initiative if we are to continue to grow.

== McKnight Foundation ==
The McKnight Foundation was established in Minneapolis in 1953 by William L. McKnight and his wife, Maude L. McKnight. One of the early leaders of 3M, William L. McKnight rose from assistant bookkeeper to president and CEO in a career that spanned 59 years, from 1907 to 1966. The McKnight Foundation, however, is an independent private philanthropic organization; it is not affiliated with the 3M Company.

In 1974, shortly after his wife's death, William L. McKnight asked their only child, Virginia McKnight Binger, to lead the Foundation. Working with Russell Ewald as executive director, Mrs. Binger established the formal grantmaking program and community-based approach that remain the Foundation's legacy today. In 2009, Robert J. Struyk was elected chair of the board of directors, succeeding Erika L. Binger and becoming the Foundation's fifth chair since it was established in 1953. Struyk earned a bachelor's degree in English at Michigan's Hope College; a master's degree in English from Columbia University; and a law degree from the University of Minnesota Law School. At the University of Minnesota, he was a member of the Order of the Coif and a case editor for the Minnesota Law Review.

Between 2020 and 2024, The McKnight Foundation awarded 5,460 grants for a total of $782 million to 1,088 different organizations; most grants are between $30,000 and $125,000.

== Personal life ==
McKnight married in 1915 and had one daughter, Virginia McKnight Binger, who married James H. Binger.

== Thoroughbred racing ==
William McKnight was a fan of Thoroughbred horse racing and owned Tartan Farms, a breeding operation near Ocala, Florida. He raced under the name Tartan Stable. Among his most noted horses were the Eclipse Award winners Dr. Fager, Ta Wee, and Dr. Patches, and the sire Intentionally. Thoroughbred Racing William L. McKnight was a significant figure in American Thoroughbred racing. He was the owner of Tartan Farms, which produced numerous successful racehorses, including the notable filly Ta Wee. Ta Wee, owned by McKnight, was a champion sprinter in 1969 and 1970. Under the training of John A. Nerud and later Flint S. Schulhofer, Ta Wee demonstrated exceptional ability, winning several important races such as the Comely, Prioress, Miss Woodford, and Test Stakes. She is also recognized for her victories in the Interborough, Vosburgh, and Fall Highweight Handicaps, often carrying considerable weight while competing against male horses. Ta Wee was inducted into the National Museum of Racing and Hall of Fame in 1994"Ta Wee (FL)". National Museum of Racing and Hall of Fame..McKnight's contributions to horse racing are commemorated through the W. L. McKnight Handicap, a Grade 3 turf race at Gulfstream Park, which highlights his lasting impact on the sport
