= Sterling Methodist Church =

Historic church in South Dakota, United States

- U.S. National Register of Historic Places
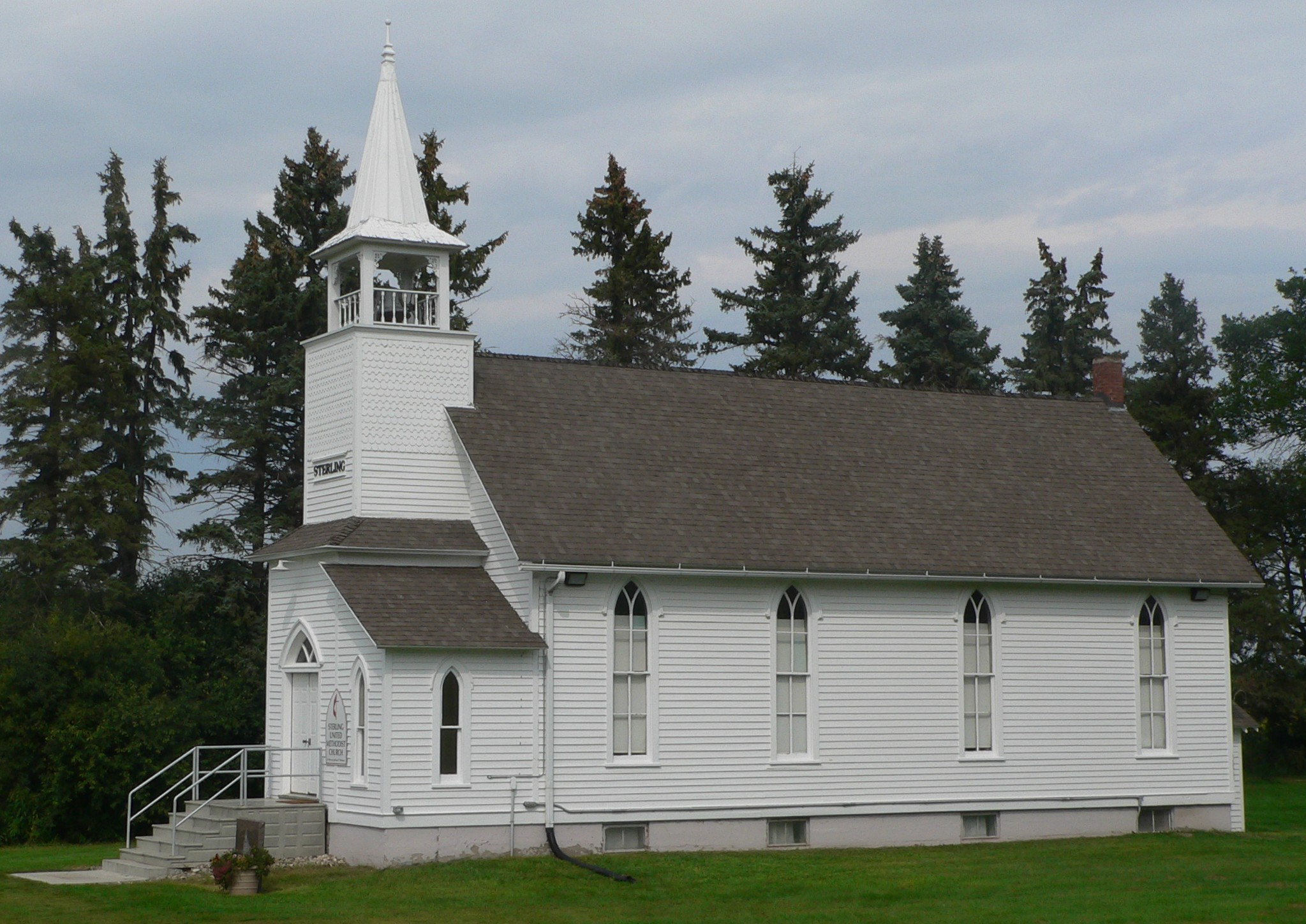

- Location within South Dakota Location within the United States
- Location: 20200 471st Ave., Bruce, South Dakota
- Coordinates: 44.455946°N 96.786894°W
- Built: 1895
- Architectural style: Nave plan church
- NRHP reference No.: 89001723
- Added to NRHP: October 19, 1989

The Sterling Methodist Church is a church in rural Brookings County, South Dakota. It was built in 1895 in Sterling Township for the Congregation of the German Methodist Episcopal Church of Sterling Township of Dakota Territory. It was added to the National Register of Historic Places on October 19, 1989.
