= Isaac Cox Cobblestone Farmstead =

Historic house in New York, United States

- U.S. National Register of Historic Places
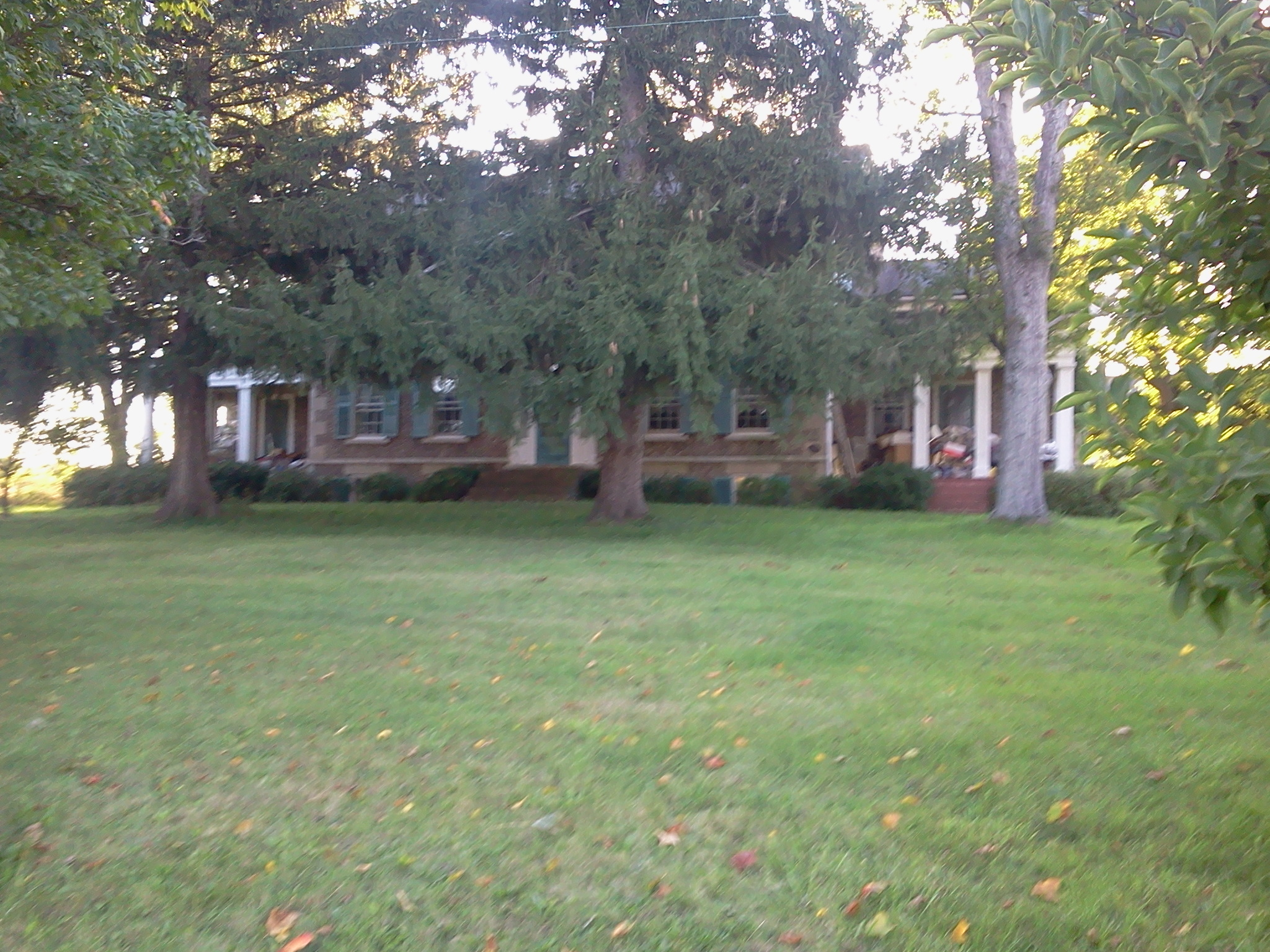

- Location within New York Location within the United States
- Nearest city: Scottsville, New York
- Coordinates: 42°59′42″N 77°44′43″W
- Area: 26 acres (11 ha)
- Built: 1838
- Architectural style: Federal
- MPS: Cobblestone Architecture of New York State MPS
- NRHP reference No.: 03000092
- Added to NRHP: March 07, 2003

Isaac Cox Cobblestone Farmstead, also known as the Letson Farm, is a historic home and farm complex located in the town of Wheatland near Scottsville in Monroe County, New York. The complex includes a Federal style cobblestone farmhouse built about 1838. It is constructed of small to medium-sized field cobbles and is one of seven surviving cobblestone buildings in the town of Wheatland. Also on the expansive property are a pair of Wells truss barns, 19th century combination corn crib / pig sty, and small 19th century smokehouse.

It was listed on the National Register of Historic Places in 2003.
