= State Soldiers Home Barn =

Historical place in South Dakota, United States

- U.S. National Register of Historic Places
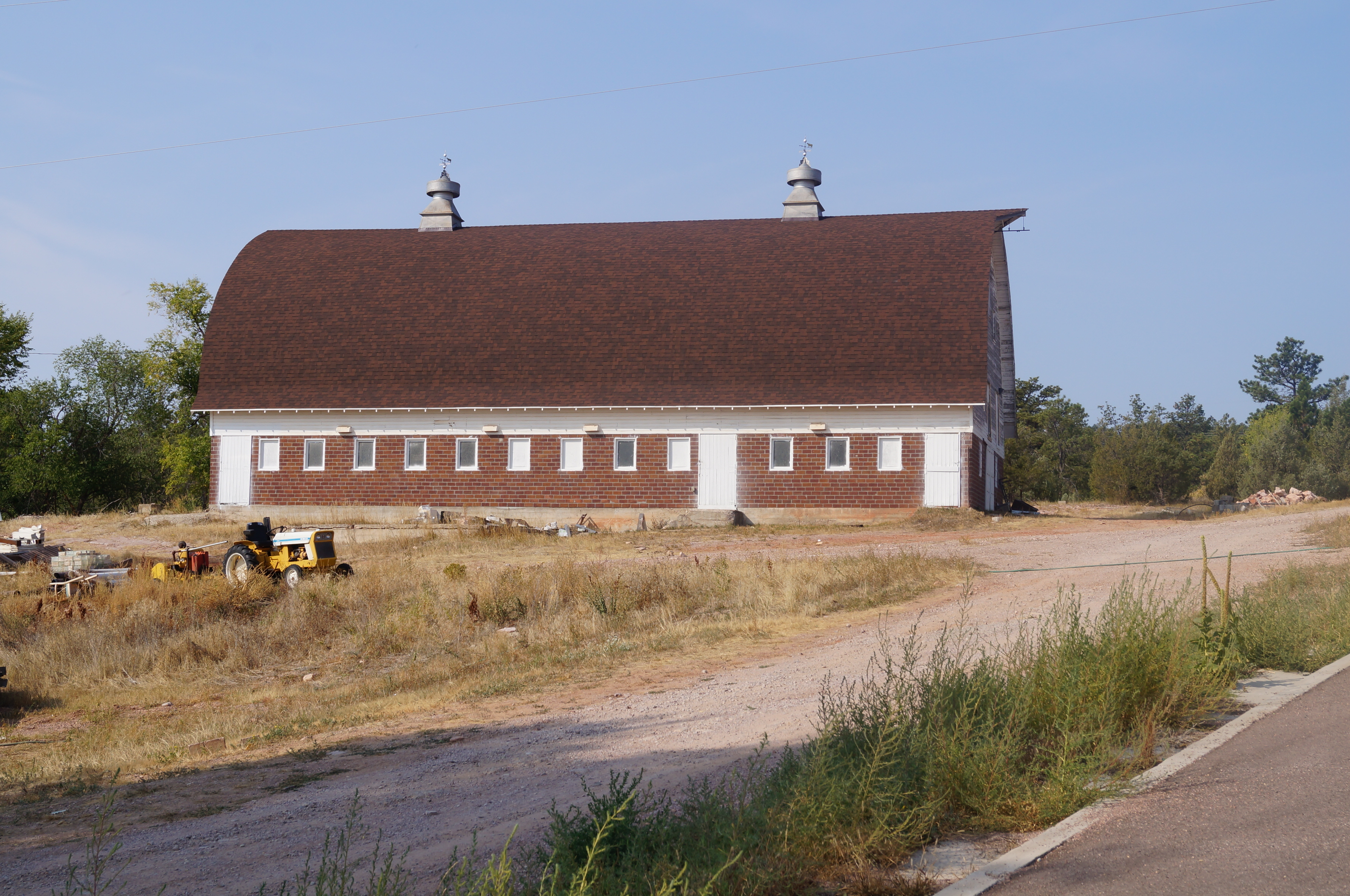

- Location within South Dakota Location within the United States
- Location: 2500 Minnekahta Ave., Hot Springs, South Dakota
- Coordinates: 43°26′13.1″N 103°29′47.5″W
- Area: less than one acre
- Built: 1929
- Architectural style: Gothic arched barn
- NRHP reference No.: 09000446
- Added to NRHP: November 5, 2009

The State Soldiers Home Barn, at 2500 Minnekahta Ave. in Hot Springs, South Dakota, was built in 1929. Also known as the Michael J. Fitzmaurice South Dakota Veterans Home Barn, it was listed on the National Register of Historic Places in 2009.

It is a Gothic-arch barn.

It was built at cost of $6,500 and was intended to help the Michael J. Fitzmaurice State Veterans Home, formerly known as the State Soldiers Home, be close to self-sufficient in food.
