= Newdale Colony, South Dakota =

- Census-designated place
- Location within South Dakota Location within the United States
- Coordinates: 44°17′24″N 96°31′27″W
- Country: United States
- State: South Dakota
- County: Brookings

Area
  - Total: 0.15 sq mi (0.38 km^{2})
  - Land: 0.14 sq mi (0.37 km^{2})
  - Water: 0.0039 sq mi (0.01 km^{2})
- Elevation: 1,703 ft (519 m)

Population (2020)
  - Total: 6
  - Density: 42.1/sq mi (16.24/km^{2})
- Time zone: UTC-6 (Central (CST))
  - Summer (DST): UTC-5 (CDT)
- ZIP Code: 57026 (Elkton)
- Area code: 605
- FIPS code: 46-44800
- GNIS feature ID: 2812998

Newdale Colony is a Hutterite colony and census-designated place (CDP) in Brookings County, South Dakota, United States. It was first listed as a CDP prior to the 2020 census. The population of the CDP was 6 at the 2020 census.

It is in the southeast part of the county, 6 miles (10 km) northwest of Elkton and 15 miles (24 km) east of Brookings, the county seat.

== Demographics ==
Historical population
Census	Pop.	Note	%±
2020	6		—
U.S. Decennial Census

== Education ==
It is in the Elkton School District 05-3.
