= Brookings Commercial Historic District =

Historic district in South Dakota, United States

- U.S. National Register of Historic Places
- U.S. Historic district
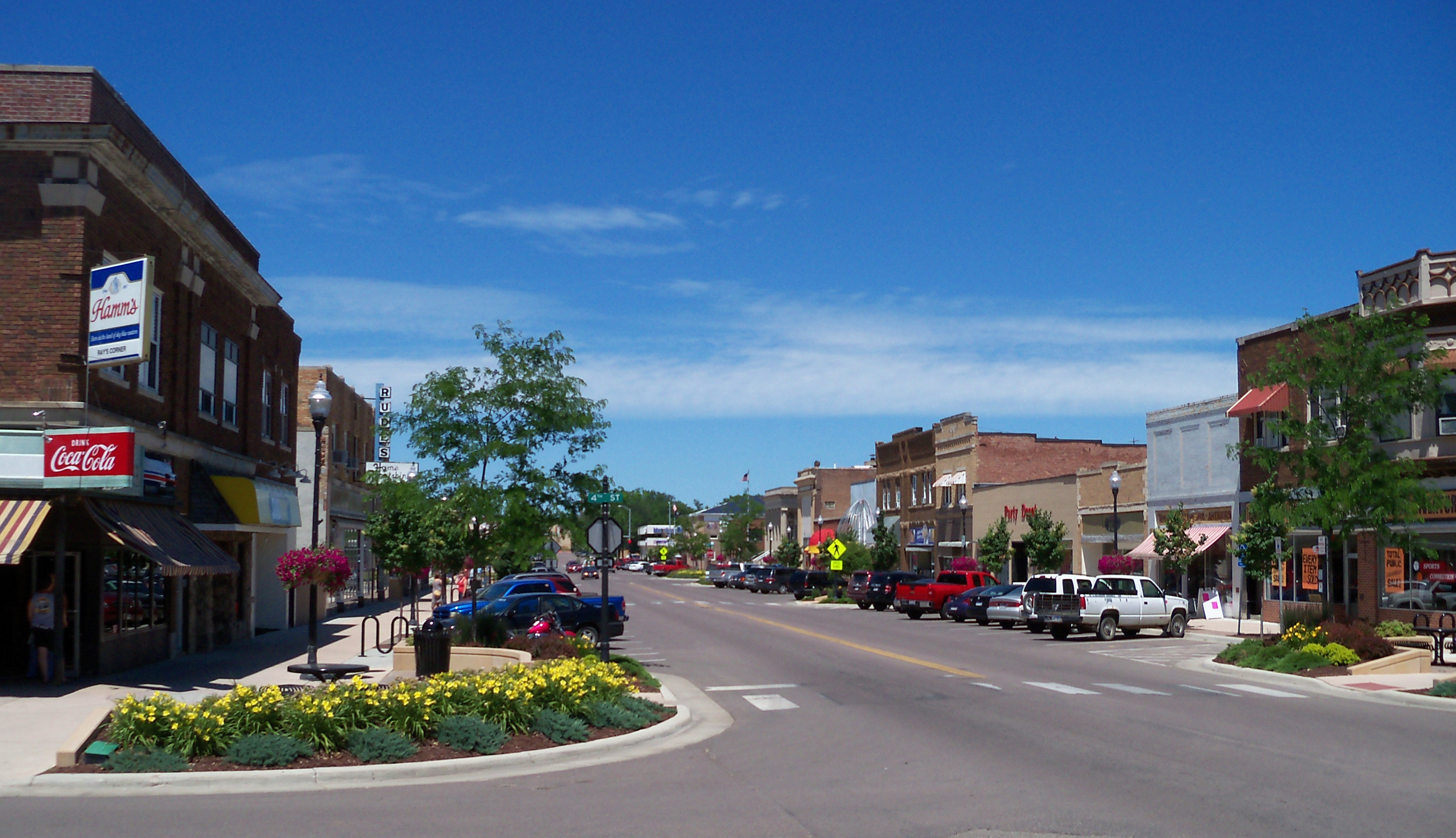

- Location within South Dakota Location within the United States
- Location: Roughly along Main Ave. between the former C&NW railroad and the alley north of Fifth St., Brookings, South Dakota
- Coordinates: 44°18′32″N 96°47′53″W
- Area: 13 acres (5.3 ha)
- Architect: Charles A. Dunham, others
- Architectural style: Beaux Arts, Art Deco
- NRHP reference No.: 88000029
- Added to NRHP: April 19, 1988

The Brookings Commercial Historic District, in Brookings, South Dakota, is a 13 acres (5.3 ha) historic district which was listed on the National Register of Historic Places in 1988.

The listing included 39 contributing buildings in an area roughly along Main Ave. between the former C&NW railroad and the alley north of Fifth St.

It includes Beaux Arts and Art Deco architecture.

It includes Nick's Hamburger Shop, which was separately listed on the National Register.
