= Wenona Hall and Wecota Hall =

- U.S. National Register of Historic Places
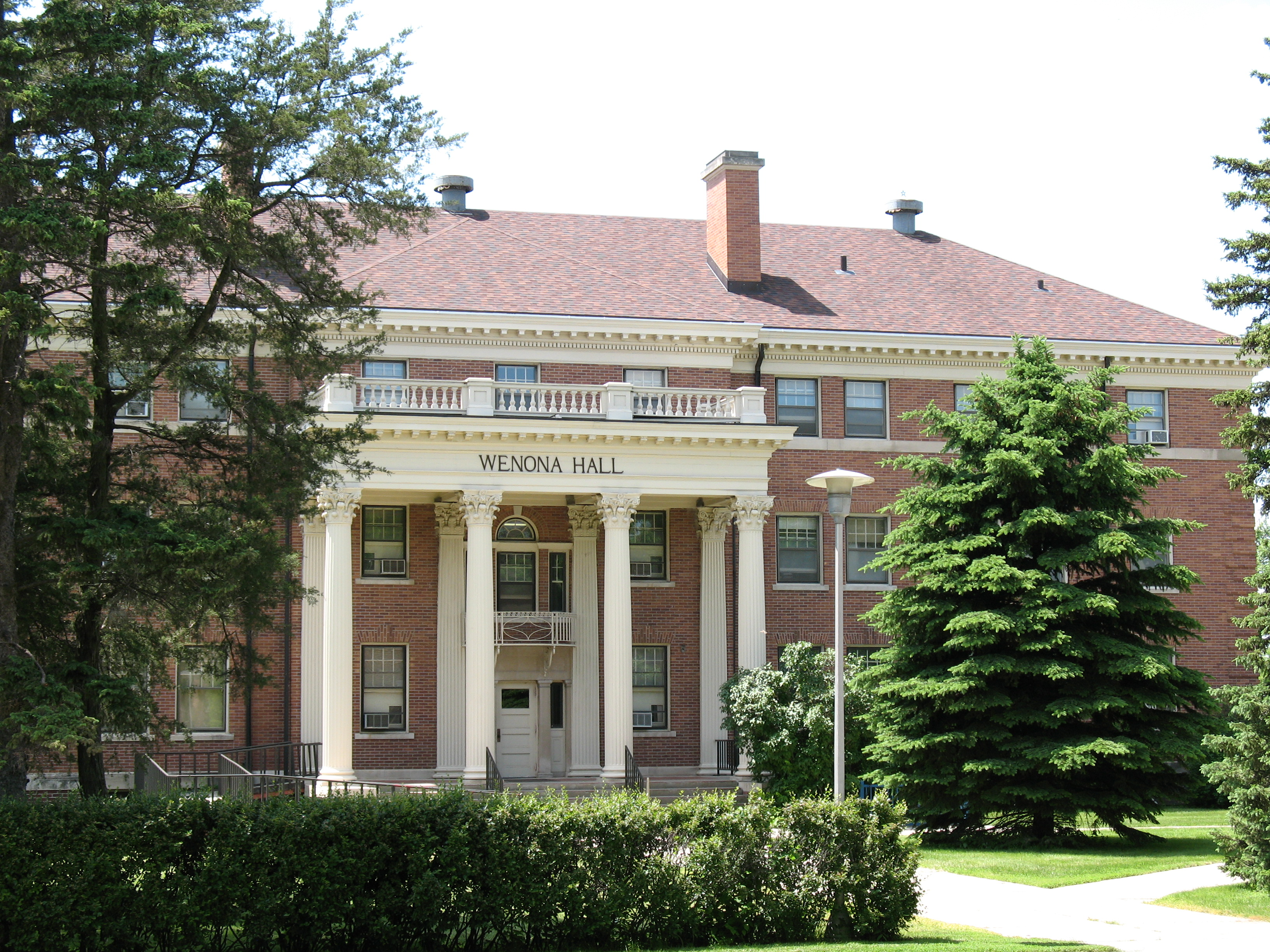
- Wenona Hall

- Location within South Dakota Location within the United States
- Location: Medary Ave., Brookings, South Dakota
- Coordinates: 44°19′4″N 96°47′20″W
- Area: less than one acre
- Built: 1909, 1915
- Architect: Schwartz, John J.
- Architectural style: Classical Revival
- NRHP reference No.: 80003718
- Added to NRHP: May 7, 1980

Wenona Hall and Wecota Hall at South Dakota State University in Brookings, South Dakota are women's dormitories that were built in 1909 and 1915. John J. Schwartz was architect. The combination was listed on the U.S. National Register of Historic Places in 1980.

The buildings were deemed to be "significant in the areas of architecture and education" and "good examples of early 20th century academic architecture"; Schwartz is held to have achieved "balance and order" in using neoclassical architecture despite constraints of large scale and many necessary window openings.
