= Brookings County Courthouse =

- U.S. National Register of Historic Places
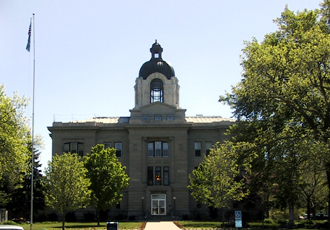

- Location within South Dakota Location within the United States
- Interactive map showing the location of Brookings County Courthouse
- Location: 4th St. and 6th Ave., Brookings, South Dakota
- Coordinates: 44°18′32″N 96°47′43″W
- Area: less than one acre
- Built: 1912
- Built by: J. B. Nelson Construction Co.
- Architect: C. E. Bell, Tyrie & Chapman
- Architectural style: Renaissance
- NRHP reference No.: 76001715
- Added to NRHP: December 12, 1976

Brookings County Courthouse, located at the intersection of 4th St. and 6th Ave. in Brookings, is Brookings County, South Dakota's county courthouse. The courthouse was built in 1912 to replace the county's original courthouse, which was erected in 1883. Architects C. E. Bell, Tyrie & Chapman designed the courthouse in the Renaissance Revival style, which was common in early 20th-century buildings. The J. B. Nelson Construction Company erected the courthouse.

The courthouse was added to the National Register of Historic Places on December 12, 1976. In 2011, the county began a $1 million renovation of the courthouse in order to meet the local circuit court's needs.
