= Arlington, South Dakota =

- City
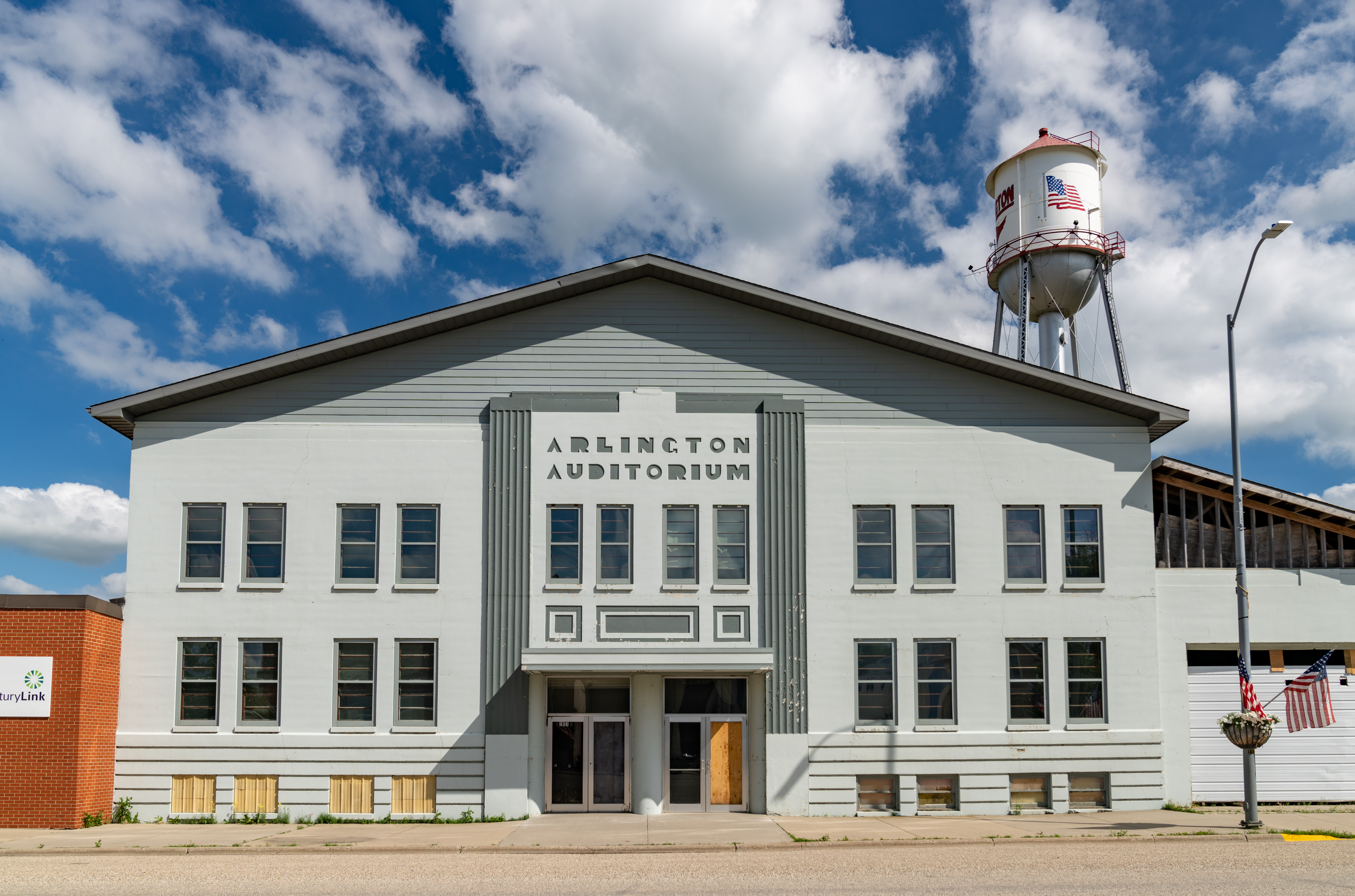
- The Arlington Auditorium in 2022

- Logo

- Location in Kingsbury County and the state of South Dakota
- Coordinates: 44°21′49″N 97°08′02″W
- Country: United States
- State: South Dakota
- Counties: Kingsbury, Brookings
- Founded: 1880

Area
  - Total: 1.72 sq mi (4.45 km^{2})
  - Land: 1.72 sq mi (4.45 km^{2})
  - Water: 0 sq mi (0.00 km^{2})
- Elevation: 1,841 ft (561 m)

Population (2020)
  - Total: 915
  - Density: 532.6/sq mi (205.64/km^{2})
- Time zone: UTC-6 (Central (CST))
  - Summer (DST): UTC-5 (CDT)
- ZIP code: 57212
- Area code: 605
- FIPS code: 46-02180
- GNIS feature ID: 1267267
- Website: www.arlingtonsd.com

Arlington is a city in Brookings and Kingsbury counties in the State of South Dakota. The population was 915 at the 2020 census.

== History ==
The city was platted by the Western Town Lot Company in 1880, and originally named Nordland, with the platted streets given Norwegian names. The city was renamed a few years later, and in 1885 given the name of Arlington, after the colonial center in Virginia. (It was briefly named Denver in the interlude, but postal authorities did not approve of the name.) The streets were not renamed until several decades passed, with Olaf Street eventually changed to Main Street, Kanut Street to Third Street, etc.

== Geography ==
Arlington is primarily in Kingsbury County.

According to the United States Census Bureau, the city has a total area of 1.66 square miles (4.30 km^{2}), all land. Lake Poinsett is to the northeast.

== Demographics ==
Historical population
Census	Pop.	Note	%±
1890	270		—
1900	314		16.3%
1910	791		151.9%
1920	1,011		27.8%
1930	1,020		0.9%
1940	1,157		13.4%
1950	1,096		−5.3%
1960	996		−9.1%
1970	954		−4.2%
1980	991		3.9%
1990	908		−8.4%
2000	992		9.3%
2010	915		−7.8%
2020	915		0.0%
U.S. Decennial Census

=== 2020 census ===
As of the 2020 census, Arlington had a population of 915. The median age was 42.8 years, with 20.3% of residents under the age of 18 and 26.1% aged 65 years or older.

For every 100 females there were 98.5 males, and for every 100 females age 18 and over there were 104.2 males age 18 and over.

0.0% of residents lived in urban areas, while 100.0% lived in rural areas.

There were 407 households in Arlington, of which 24.8% had children under the age of 18 living in them. Of all households, 45.5% were married-couple households, 23.3% were households with a male householder and no spouse or partner present, and 23.8% were households with a female householder and no spouse or partner present. About 34.6% of all households were made up of individuals and 17.0% had someone living alone who was 65 years of age or older.

There were 467 housing units, of which 12.8% were vacant. The homeowner vacancy rate was 0.0% and the rental vacancy rate was 11.8%.

Racial composition as of the 2020 census
Race	Number	Percent
White	877	95.8%
Black or African American	1	0.1%
American Indian and Alaska Native	0	0.0%
Asian	5	0.5%
Native Hawaiian and Other Pacific Islander	0	0.0%
Some other race	9	1.0%
Two or more races	23	2.5%
Hispanic or Latino (of any race)	32	3.5%

=== 2010 census ===
As of the census of 2010, there were 915 people, 420 households, and 243 families residing in the city. The population density was 551.2 inhabitants per square mile (212.8/km^{2}). There were 489 housing units at an average density of 294.6 units per square mile (113.7 units/km^{2}). The racial makeup of the city was 97.4% White, 0.7% African American, 1.1% Native American, 0.1% Asian, 0.1% from other races, and 0.7% from two or more races. Hispanic or Latino of any race were 2.5% of the population.

There were 420 households, of which 23.8% had children under the age of 18 living with them, 48.8% were married couples living together, 6.2% had a female householder with no husband present, 2.9% had a male householder with no wife present, and 42.1% were non-families. 39.0% of all households were made up of individuals, and 18.5% had someone living alone who was 65 years of age or older. The average household size was 2.09 and the average family size was 2.77.

The median age in the city was 46 years. 21% of residents were under the age of 18; 5.2% were between the ages of 18 and 24; 22.4% were from 25 to 44; 27.9% were from 45 to 64; and 23.5% were 65 years of age or older. The gender makeup of the city was 50.4% male and 49.6% female.

=== 2000 census ===
As of the census of 2000, there were 992 people, 424 households, and 262 families residing in the city. The population density was 635.6 inhabitants per square mile (245.4/km^{2}). There were 473 housing units at an average density of 303.0 units per square mile (117.0 units/km^{2}). The racial makeup of the city was 98.49% White, 0.20% Native American, 0.71% Asian, and 0.60% from two or more races.

There were 424 households, out of which 25.5% had children under the age of 18 living with them, 54.2% were married couples living together, 5.2% had a female householder with no husband present, and 38.2% were non-families. 36.1% of all households were made up of individuals, and 22.9% had someone living alone who was 65 years of age or older. The average household size was 2.23 and the average family size was 2.90.

In the city, the population was spread out, with 21.9% under the age of 18, 6.8% from 18 to 24, 23.7% from 25 to 44, 18.2% from 45 to 64, and 29.4% who were 65 years of age or older. The median age was 43 years. For every 100 females, there were 90.8 males. For every 100 females age 18 and over, there were 84.1 males.

The median income for a household in the city was $34,688, and the median income for a family was $43,813. Males had a median income of $29,083 versus $19,531 for females. The per capita income for the city was $17,858. About 1.9% of families and 4.4% of the population were below the poverty line, including 5.8% of those under age 18 and 8.0% of those age 65 or over.

== Education ==
Arlington Public Schools are part of the Arlington School District, which coves all parts of the municipality. The district has one elementary school, one junior high school and one high school. Students attend Arlington High School.

== Media ==
The Arlington Sun has been published in Arlington since 1885. It is a weekly newspaper currently published by Kenneth Reiste.

== Infrastructure ==
=== Transportation ===
The Arlington Municipal Airport is in Brookings County, two nautical miles (2.3 mi; 3.7 km) north of Arlington's central business district.

== Notable person ==
- Theodore Schultz (1902–1998), co-winner of the Nobel Prize in Economics in 1979

== See also ==
- List of cities in South Dakota
