= Arlington Municipal Airport (South Dakota) =

Airport in Arlington, South Dakota

- IATA: none; ICAO: none; FAA LID: 3A9

Summary
- Airport type: Public
- Owner: City of Arlington
- Serves: Arlington, South Dakota
- Location: Brookings County, South Dakota
- Elevation AMSL: 1,818 ft (554 m)
- Coordinates: 44°23′40″N 097°07′23″W
- Interactive map of Arlington Municipal Airport

Runways
Direction	Length		Surface
Direction	ft	m	Surface
14/32	3,000	914	Turf
4/22	2,400	732	Turf

Statistics (2010)
- Aircraft operations: 2,000
- Based aircraft: 7
- Source: Federal Aviation Administration

Arlington Municipal Airport (FAA LID: 3A9) is a city-owned public-use airport in Brookings County, South Dakota, United States. It is located two nautical miles (2.3 mi; 3.7 km) north of the central business district of Arlington, a city in Brookings and Kingsbury counties.

== Facilities and aircraft ==
Arlington Municipal Airport covers an area of 175 acres (71 ha) at an elevation of 1,818 feet (554 m) above mean sea level. It has two runways with turf surfaces: 14/32 is 3,000 by 250 feet (914 by 76 m) and 4/22 is 2,400 by 250 feet (732 by 76 m).

For the 12-month period ending July 12, 2010, the airport had 2,000 general aviation aircraft operations, an average of 166 per month. At that time there were seven aircraft based at this airport: 57% single-engine and 43% glider.

== See also ==
- List of airports in South Dakota
