= Nick's Hamburger Shop =

- U.S. National Register of Historic Places
- U.S. Historic district – Contributing property
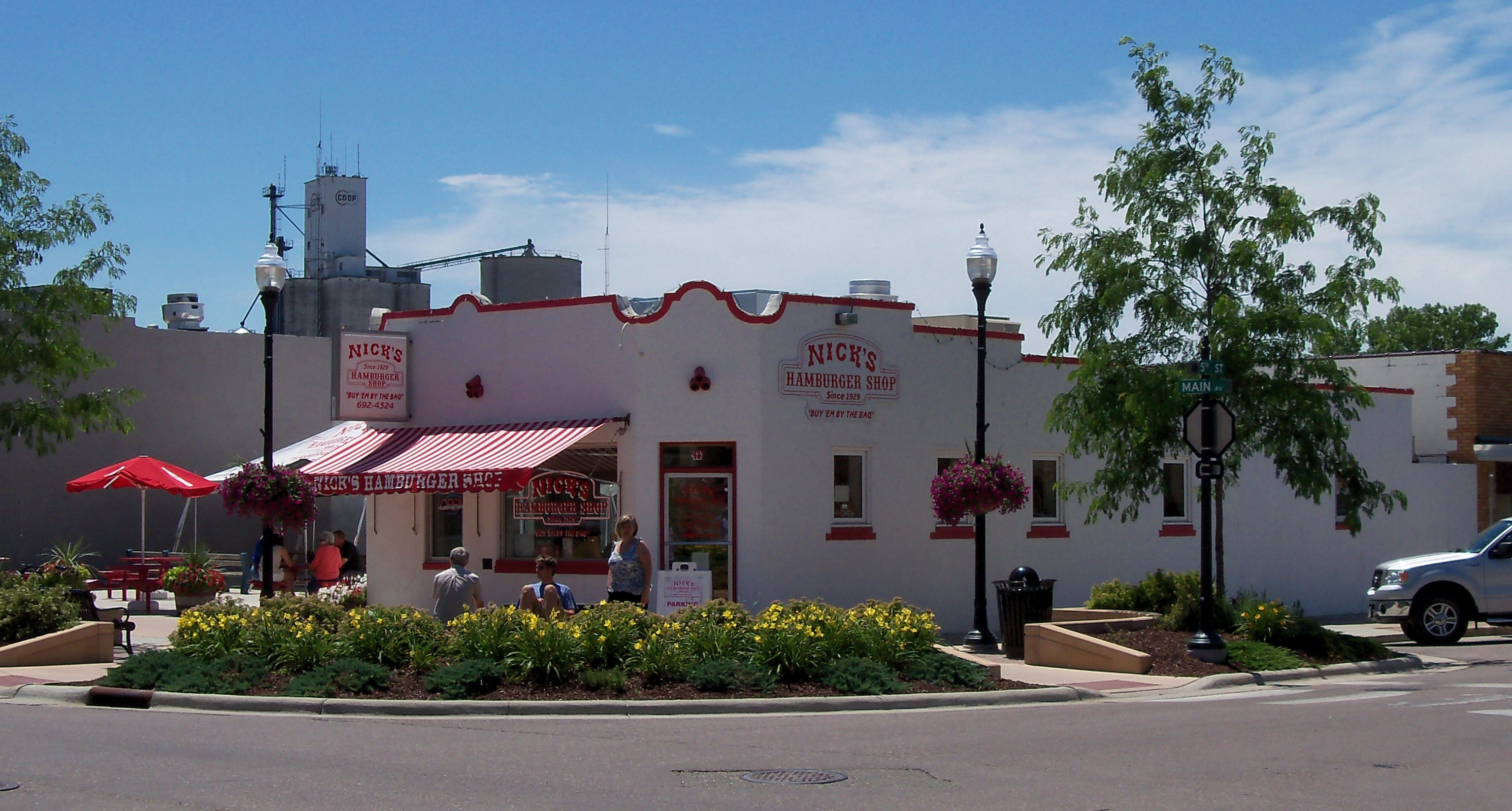

- Location within South Dakota Location within the United States
- Location: 427 Main Ave., Brookings, South Dakota
- Coordinates: 44°18′36″N 96°47′56″W
- Area: less than one acre
- Built: 1932
- Built by: Carlsen, Fred
- Architectural style: Mission/Spanish Revival, Spanish Colonial Revival
- Part of: Brookings Commercial Historic District (ID88000029)
- NRHP reference No.: 86003008

Significant dates
- Added to NRHP: November 6, 1986
- Designated CP: April 19, 1988

Nick's Hamburger Shop is a building at 427 Main Ave. in Brookings, South Dakota, United States, which is listed on the National Register of Historic Places.

It is also included in the Brookings Commercial Historic District, which is also National Register-listed.

Its front is divided into two narrow store fronts, one used by the Main Barbershop and one by Nick's. Built in 1932, the building originally was 25 by 40 feet (7.6 m × 12.2 m) in plan; it was expanded in 1962 by a 18 by 25 feet (5.5 m × 7.6 m) rear addition for a kitchen area.
