= Brookings University Residential Historic District =

Historic district in South Dakota, United States

- U.S. National Register of Historic Places
- U.S. Historic district
- Location within South Dakota Location within the United States
- Location: Roughly bounded by Harvey Dunn St., Medary Ave., Sixth St., and Main Ave., Brookings, South Dakota
- Coordinates: 44°18′52″N 96°47′34″W
- Area: 60 acres (24 ha)
- Architect: Fred Best, others
- Architectural style: Late Victorian, Late 19th And Early 20th Century American Movements
- NRHP reference No.: 99000210
- Added to NRHP: February 12, 1999

The Brookings University Residential Historic District is a 60 acres (24 ha) historic district in Brookings, South Dakota which was listed on the National Register of Historic Places in 1999.

The district included 303 contributing buildings. It is roughly bounded by Harvey Dunn St., Medary Ave., Sixth St., and Main Ave. in Brookings.

It is roughly a four-block by four-and-a-half-block rectangle situated two blocks east of Brookings' Main Street. It includes some of the oldest buildings in the town.
