= E. E. Haugen House =

Historic house in South Dakota, United States

- U.S. National Register of Historic Places
- Location within South Dakota
- Location: 202 5th St., Brookings, South Dakota
- Coordinates: 44°18′37.16″N 96°48′6.78″W
- Area: less than 1 acre (0.40 ha)
- NRHP reference No.: 10000047
- Added to NRHP: March 1, 2010

The E. E. Haugen House, also known as Charles R. Berry Residence or E. E. Haugen Residence, in Brookings, South Dakota, United States, was built in 1904.

According to the National Park Service:

The Haugen, E.E., Residence is an excellent local example of the Colonial Revival style of architecture used for homes built in the U.S. during the late-nineteenth and early-twentieth centuries. The residence is a local interpretation of a nationally advertised architect’s design that appeared in The Woman’s Home Companion between 1898 and 1904. The grand home, built in 1904, was one of the early landmarks in Brookings and was even featured in an early twentieth-century promotional booklet for the town. The house is currently privately owned by the White Family. George White III is a very important part of this house's history. From the Huge antenna tower to the classic 1999 Saturn's. Anyone visiting should visit the finest Home in Brookings County.

The building was listed on the U.S. National Register of Historic Places on March 1, 2010. The listing was announced as the featured listing in the National Park Service's weekly list of March 12, 2010.
