= Aurora, South Dakota =

Town in South Dakota, United States

Aurora
- Town
- Location in Brookings County and the state of South Dakota
- Coordinates: 44°16′56″N 96°41′13″W
- Country: United States
- State: South Dakota
- County: Brookings
- Founded: 1880

Government
  - Mayor: Josh Jones

Area
  - Total: 0.61 sq mi (1.57 km^{2})
  - Land: 0.61 sq mi (1.57 km^{2})
  - Water: 0 sq mi (0.00 km^{2})
- Elevation: 1,627 ft (496 m)

Population (2020)
  - Total: 1,047
  - Estimate (2022): 1,132
  - Density: 1,722.1/sq mi (664.89/km^{2})
- Time zone: UTC-6 (Central)
  - Summer (DST): UTC-5 (CDT)
- ZIP code: 57002
- Area code: 605
- FIPS code: 46-02780
- GNIS feature ID: 1267273
- Website: cityofaurorasd.com

Aurora is a town in Brookings County, South Dakota, United States. The population was 1,047 at the 2020 census.

== History ==
Aurora was platted in 1880. It was named after Aurora, Illinois, by a settler from that place.

== Geography ==
According to the United States Census Bureau, the town has a total area of 0.46 square miles (1.19 km^{2}), all land.

== Demographics ==
Historical population
Census	Pop.	Note	%±
1910	236		—
1920	246		4.2%
1930	166		−32.5%
1940	225		35.5%
1950	202		−10.2%
1960	232		14.9%
1970	237		2.2%
1980	507		113.9%
1990	619		22.1%
2000	500		−19.2%
2010	532		6.4%
2020	1,047		96.8%
2022 (est.)	1,132	▲	8.1%
U.S. Decennial Census; 2020 Census

=== 2020 census ===
As of the 2020 census, there were 1,047 people, 474 households.

=== 2010 census ===
As of the census of 2010, there were 532 people, 233 households, and 144 families living in the town. The population density was 1,156.5 inhabitants per square mile (446.5/km^{2}). There were 256 housing units at an average density of 556.5 per square mile (214.9/km^{2}). The racial makeup of the town was 95.5% White, 2.6% Native American, 0.2% Asian, and 1.7% from two or more races. Hispanic or Latino of any race were 0.9% of the population.

There were 233 households, of which 29.2% had children under the age of 18 living with them, 48.5% were married couples living together, 7.3% had a female householder with no husband present, 6.0% had a male householder with no wife present, and 38.2% were non-families. 30.9% of all households were made up of individuals, and 6.4% had someone living alone who was 65 years of age or older. The average household size was 2.28 and the average family size was 2.88.

The median age in the town was 33.8 years. 23.3% of residents were under the age of 18; 9.9% were between the ages of 18 and 24; 32.4% were from 25 to 44; 26.6% were from 45 to 64; and 7.9% were 65 years of age or older. The gender makeup of the town was 53.0% male and 47.0% female.

=== 2000 census ===
As of the census of 2000, there were 500 people, 205 households, and 136 families living in the town. The population density was 1,090.5 people per square mile (421.0 people/km^{2}). There were 221 housing units at an average density of 482.0 per square mile (186.1/km^{2}). The racial makeup of the town was 98.00% White, 1.40% Native American, and 0.60% from two or more races.

There were 205 households, out of which 36.6% had children under the age of 18 living with them, 59.0% were married couples living together, 5.9% had a female householder with no husband present, and 33.2% were non-families. 27.8% of all households were made up of individuals, and 8.3% had someone living alone who was 65 years of age or older. The average household size was 2.44 and the average family size was 3.03.

In the town, the population was spread out, with 25.4% under the age of 18, 11.8% from 18 to 24, 32.0% from 25 to 44, 21.8% from 45 to 64, and 9.0% who were 65 years of age or older. The median age was 33 years. For every 100 females, there were 107.5 males. For every 100 females age 18 and over, there were 102.7 males.

The median income for a household in the town was $38,456, and the median income for a family was $43,500. Males had a median income of $26,953 versus $20,089 for females. The per capita income for the town was $15,819. None of the families and 2.4% of the population were living below the poverty line, including no under eighteens and 8.8% of those over 64.

== Education ==
It is in the Brookings School District 05-1.

== Sports ==
The only two sports teams in Aurora are both baseball teams, American Legion Baseball Post 230 (2002–Present) & the Aurora A's (2000–2018), who became the Aurora Aces (2019–present). Both programs play their home games at Langland Field (formerly referred to as Aurora Ballpark), dedicated on October 19, 2019, in memorial to Jake Langland (June 29, 1985 - June 1, 2019), who played three seasons with Post 230 (2003–05), co-managed the team in 2006, and played for the A's 2006–07. Langland Field is located two blocks west of the city water tower, on Maple Ave., with the left field bordered by W. Pine St. and right field bordered by Oak Ave.

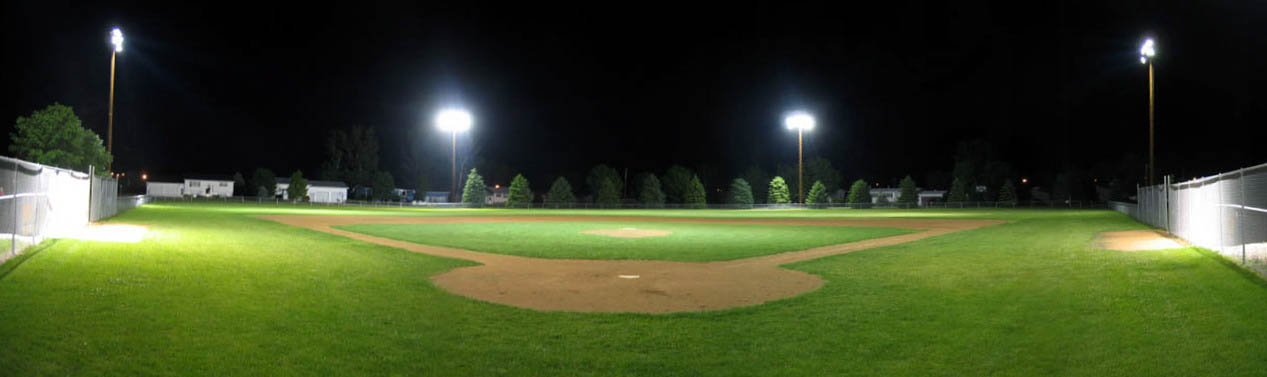
Aurora Ballpark (c. 2008)

At its peak (2006–2010), the Aurora A's won the EDL district championship multiple times, and simultaneously possessed up to six current or former collegiate baseball players on its roster at once.

== See also ==
- List of towns in South Dakota
