= Brookings County, South Dakota =

County in South Dakota, United States

- County
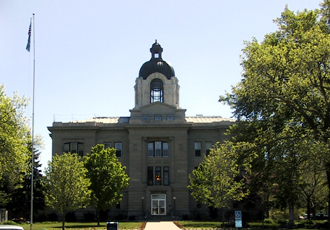
- Brookings County Courthouse in Brookings

- Location within the U.S. state of South Dakota
- Coordinates: 44°22′N 96°47′W
- Country: United States
- State: South Dakota
- Founded: 1862 (created); July 3, 1871 (organized)
- Named for: Wilmot Wood Brookings
- Seat: Brookings
- Largest city: Brookings

Area
  - Total: 805 sq mi (2,080 km^{2})
  - Land: 792 sq mi (2,050 km^{2})
  - Water: 13 sq mi (34 km^{2}) 1.6%

Population (2020)
  - Total: 34,375
  - Estimate (2025): 37,635 ▲
  - Density: 47.5/sq mi (18.3/km^{2})
- Time zone: UTC−6 (Central)
  - Summer (DST): UTC−5 (CDT)
- Congressional district: At-large
- Website: www.brookingscountysd.gov

Brookings County is a county in the U.S. state of South Dakota. As of the 2020 census, the population was 34,375, making it the fifth most populous county in South Dakota. Its county seat is Brookings. The county was created in 1862 and organized in 1871.

Brookings County comprises the Brookings, SD Micropolitan Statistical Area. It is also the location of South Dakota State University.

== History ==
The county was organized July 3, 1871, and was named for Wilmot Wood Brookings (1830-1905), a politician and pioneer of southeastern South Dakota. Medary was the first county seat, from 1871 to 1879, when it was moved to the city of Brookings.

== Geography ==
Soils of Brookings County

Brookings County is on the east side of South Dakota. Its east boundary line abuts the west boundary line of the state of Minnesota. The Big Sioux River flows south-southeastward through the east central part of the county; its point of entry into Moody County marks Brookings County's lowest elevation: 1,568 ft (478 m) ASL.

The county terrain consists of sloped flatlands, marked by numerous lakes and ponds especially in the western part. The area is largely devoted to agricultural use. The county has a total area of 805 square miles (2,080 km^{2}), of which 782 square miles (2,030 km^{2}) is land and 13 square miles (34 km^{2}) (1.6%) is water.

=== Major highways ===
- Interstate 29
- U.S. Highway 14

- U.S. Highway 14 Bypass
- U.S. Highway 81
- South Dakota Highway 13
- South Dakota Highway 30
- South Dakota Highway 324

=== Airports ===
- Brookings Regional Airport
- Arlington Municipal Airport

=== Transit ===
- Jefferson Lines

=== Adjacent counties ===
- Deuel County – north
- Lincoln County, Minnesota – east
- Pipestone County, Minnesota – southeast
- Moody County – south
- Lake County – southwest
- Kingsbury County – west
- Hamlin County – northwest

=== Lakes ===
- Brush Lake
- Johnson Lake
- Lake Campbell
- Lake Goldsmith
- Lake Hendricks (partial)
- Lake Poinsett
- Lake Sinai
- Lake Tetonkaha
- Oak Lake
- Oakwood Lake

=== Protected areas ===
- Aurora Prairie Nature Preserve
- Black Slough State Game Production Area
- Brookings County State Game Production Area
- Brookings Prairie Park
- Dakota Nature Park
- Deer Creek State Game Production Area
- Kvernmoe Slough State Game Production Area
- Lake Hendricks State Lakeside Use Area
- Lake Poinsett State Recreation Area
- Mehegan State Game Production Area
- Moe Slough State game Production Area
- Nelson State Game Production Area
- Oak Lake State Game Production Area
- Oakwood Lake State Game Production Area
- Oakwood Lakes State Park

== Demographics ==
Historical population
Census	Pop.	Note	%±
1870	163		—
1880	4,965		2,946.0%
1890	10,132		104.1%
1900	12,561		24.0%
1910	14,178		12.9%
1920	16,119		13.7%
1930	16,847		4.5%
1940	16,560		−1.7%
1950	17,851		7.8%
1960	20,046		12.3%
1970	22,158		10.5%
1980	24,332		9.8%
1990	25,207		3.6%
2000	28,220		12.0%
2010	31,965		13.3%
2020	34,375		7.5%
2025 (est.)	37,635	▲	9.5%
U.S. Decennial Census:

=== 2020 census ===
As of the 2020 census, there were 34,375 people, 13,120 households, and 7,419 families residing in the county. The population density was 43.4 inhabitants per square mile (16.8/km^{2}).

Of the residents, 21.0% were under the age of 18 and 13.4% were 65 years of age or older; the median age was 29.7 years. For every 100 females there were 104.3 males, and for every 100 females age 18 and over there were 103.9 males.

The racial makeup of the county was 88.1% White, 1.9% Black or African American, 1.2% American Indian and Alaska Native, 2.7% Asian, 1.9% from some other race, and 4.2% from two or more races. Hispanic or Latino residents of any race comprised 4.2% of the population.

There were 13,120 households in the county, of which 27.1% had children under the age of 18 living with them and 23.9% had a female householder with no spouse or partner present. About 31.6% of all households were made up of individuals and 9.6% had someone living alone who was 65 years of age or older.

There were 14,849 housing units, of which 11.6% were vacant. Among occupied housing units, 59.4% were owner-occupied and 40.6% were renter-occupied. The homeowner vacancy rate was 1.3% and the rental vacancy rate was 13.9%.

=== 2010 census ===
As of the 2010 census, there were 31,965 people, 12,029 households, and 6,623 families in the county. The population density was 40.3 inhabitants per square mile (15.6/km^{2}). There were 13,137 housing units at an average density of 16.6 per square mile (6.4/km^{2}). The racial makeup of the county was 93.2% white, 2.7% Asian, 0.9% American Indian, 0.8% black or African American, 0.9% from other races, and 1.4% from two or more races. Those of Hispanic or Latino origin made up 2.0% of the population. In terms of ancestry, 47.9% were German, 24.3% were Norwegian, 11.9% were Irish, 6.9% were English, 6.1% were Dutch, and 2.0% were American.

Of the 12,029 households, 25.9% had children under the age of 18 living with them, 45.6% were married couples living together, 6.1% had a female householder with no husband present, 44.9% were non-families, and 29.6% of all households were made up of individuals. The average household size was 2.36 and the average family size was 2.93. The median age was 26.3 years.

The median income for a household in the county was $45,134 and the median income for a family was $63,338. Males had a median income of $40,425 versus $30,023 for females. The per capita income for the county was $20,995. About 5.9% of families and 19.1% of the population were below the poverty line, including 8.2% of those under age 18 and 7.6% of those age 65 or over.

== Communities ==
=== Cities ===
- Arlington (partial)
- Brookings (county seat)
- Bruce
- Elkton
- Volga
- White

=== Towns ===
- Aurora
- Bushnell
- Sinai

=== Census-designated places ===
- Lake Poinsett
- Newdale Colony
- Norfeld Colony
- Rolland Colony

=== Unincorporated communities ===
- Ahnberg
- Medary
- Sunnyview

=== Townships ===
- Afton
- Alton
- Argo
- Aurora
- Bangor
- Brookings
- Elkton
- Eureka
- Lake Hendricks
- Lake Sinai
- Laketon
- Medary
- Oaklake
- Oakwood
- Oslo
- Parnell
- Preston
- Richland
- Sherman
- Sterling
- Trenton
- Volga
- Winsor

== Politics ==
Typical of the Great Plains, Brookings County voters are reliably Republican, even for a county with politics influenced by a college town. In only two national elections since 1932 has the county selected the Democratic Party candidate. Despite being reliably Republican territory, no Republican has taken over 60% of the vote since Ronald Reagan in 1984.

United States presidential election results for Brookings County, South Dakota
Year	Republican		Democratic		Third party(ies)	
Year	No.	%	No.	%	No.	%
1892	1,082	51.57%	189	9.01%	827	39.42%
1896	1,263	48.71%	1,288	49.67%	42	1.62%
1900	1,707	57.36%	1,084	36.42%	185	6.22%
1904	2,220	76.18%	353	12.11%	341	11.70%
1908	1,697	63.58%	588	22.03%	384	14.39%
1912	0	0.00%	740	30.90%	1,655	69.10%
1916	1,638	51.79%	1,385	43.79%	140	4.43%
1920	2,743	68.64%	564	14.11%	689	17.24%
1924	4,708	48.51%	1,010	10.41%	3,987	41.08%
1928	4,586	70.05%	1,915	29.25%	46	0.70%
1932	3,231	48.96%	3,247	49.20%	121	1.83%
1936	3,899	53.40%	3,161	43.29%	242	3.31%
1940	5,016	65.25%	2,671	34.75%	0	0.00%
1944	4,136	66.61%	2,073	33.39%	0	0.00%
1948	3,975	57.39%	2,907	41.97%	44	0.64%
1952	5,988	76.29%	1,861	23.71%	0	0.00%
1956	5,293	66.89%	2,620	33.11%	0	0.00%
1960	5,710	65.75%	2,974	34.25%	0	0.00%
1964	3,692	46.83%	4,191	53.17%	0	0.00%
1968	4,674	57.84%	3,202	39.62%	205	2.54%
1972	5,182	52.26%	4,701	47.41%	33	0.33%
1976	5,278	52.64%	4,685	46.73%	63	0.63%
1980	5,727	52.15%	3,934	35.83%	1,320	12.02%
1984	6,679	61.76%	4,089	37.81%	46	0.43%
1988	5,394	52.34%	4,860	47.16%	51	0.49%
1992	4,698	39.14%	4,645	38.70%	2,659	22.15%
1996	5,112	45.35%	5,105	45.29%	1,055	9.36%
2000	6,212	56.55%	4,546	41.39%	226	2.06%
2004	7,662	57.29%	5,443	40.70%	270	2.02%
2008	6,431	46.12%	7,207	51.68%	307	2.20%
2012	6,220	50.16%	5,827	46.99%	353	2.85%
2016	6,748	53.22%	4,879	38.48%	1,053	8.30%
2020	8,000	54.92%	6,110	41.94%	457	3.14%
2024	8,575	57.40%	5,978	40.02%	386	2.58%

== Education ==
School districts include:

- Arlington School District 38-1
- Brookings School District 05-1
- Deubrook School District 05-6
- Elkton School District 05-3
- Estelline School District 28-2
- Sioux Valley School District 05-5

== See also ==
- National Register of Historic Places listings in Brookings County, South Dakota
