= Lake Poinsett (South Dakota) =

Lake in the state of South Dakota, United States

- Location within South Dakota Location within the United States
- Location: Hamlin / Brookings counties, near Arlington, South Dakota
- Coordinates: 44°34′6″N 97°5′7″W
- Basin countries: United States
- Surface elevation: 1,650 ft (503 m)

Lake Poinsett is one of the largest lakes in the state of South Dakota.

The lake is located northeast of the town of Arlington, South Dakota. It has the name of the U. S. Secretary of War, Joel Poinsett. In 1838, the area was first visited by the expedition of Joseph Nicollet and John Fremont, who camped on the lake's north shore. Poinsett was instrumental in promoting the expedition.

Shoreside housing developments along the lake comprise the census-designated place of Lake Poinsett.

== See also ==
- List of lakes in South Dakota
- List of lakes of the United States
