= Lake Poinsett, South Dakota =

- Census-designated place
- Location within South Dakota
- Coordinates: 44°33′59″N 97°04′47″W
- Country: United States
- State: South Dakota
- Counties: Hamlin, Brookings

Area
  - Total: 17.77 sq mi (46.03 km^{2})
  - Land: 4.89 sq mi (12.66 km^{2})
  - Water: 12.88 sq mi (33.37 km^{2})
- Elevation: 1,641 ft (500 m)

Population (2020)
  - Total: 501
  - Density: 102.5/sq mi (39.57/km^{2})
- Time zone: UTC-6 (Central (CST))
  - Summer (DST): UTC-5 (CDT)
- Area code: 605
- FIPS code: 46-35480
- GNIS feature ID: 2584558

Lake Poinsett is a census-designated place (CDP) in Hamlin and Brookings counties in South Dakota, United States. The population was 501 at the 2020 census.

== Geography ==
The Lake Poinsett CDP comprises the lake of the same name and its shoreside communities in Hamlin and Brookings counties. U.S. Route 81 passes through the CDP along the western shore of the lake and leads north 24 miles (39 km) to Watertown and south 13 miles (21 km) to Arlington.

According to the United States Census Bureau, the Lake Poinsett CDP has a total area of 17.8 square miles (46.0 km^{2}), of which 5.2 square miles (13.5 km^{2}) is land and 12.5 square miles (32.5 km^{2}), or 70.67%, is water.

== Demographics ==
Historical population
Census	Pop.	Note	%±
2020	501		—
U.S. Decennial Census

== Education ==
Within Hamlin County, the northwestern part is in the Hamlin School District 28-3, the northeastern part is in the Estelline School District 28-2, and a small southern part is in the Arlington School District 38-1.

The portion in Brookings County is in the Arlington School District.
