= Bushnell, South Dakota =

Town in South Dakota, United States

- Town
- Location in Brookings County and the state of South Dakota
- Coordinates: 44°19′39″N 96°38′33″W
- Country: United States
- State: South Dakota
- County: Brookings
- Incorporated: 1915

Area
  - Total: 0.71 sq mi (1.84 km^{2})
  - Land: 0.71 sq mi (1.84 km^{2})
  - Water: 0 sq mi (0.00 km^{2})
- Elevation: 1,686 ft (514 m)

Population (2020)
  - Total: 71
  - Density: 99.8/sq mi (38.54/km^{2})
- Time zone: UTC-6 (Central (CST))
  - Summer (DST): UTC-5 (CDT)
- ZIP code: 57276
- Area code: 605
- FIPS code: 46-08820
- GNIS feature ID: 1267305

Bushnell is a town in Brookings County, South Dakota, United States. The population was 71 at the 2020 census.

== History ==
Bushnell was laid out in 1904 and named for Frank Bushnell, the original owner of the site.

== Geography ==
According to the United States Census Bureau, the town has a total area of 0.71 square miles (1.84 km^{2}), all land.

== Demographics ==
Historical population
Census	Pop.	Note	%±
1920	150		—
1930	134		−10.7%
1940	134		0.0%
1950	96		−28.4%
1960	92		−4.2%
1970	65		−29.3%
1980	76		16.9%
1990	81		6.6%
2000	75		−7.4%
2010	65		−13.3%
2020	71		9.2%
U.S. Decennial Census

=== 2010 census ===
As of the census of 2010, there were 65 people, 28 households, and 18 families residing in the town. The population density was 91.5 inhabitants per square mile (35.3/km^{2}). There were 32 housing units at an average density of 45.1 per square mile (17.4/km^{2}). The racial makeup of the town was 90.8% White, 7.7% Native American, and 1.5% from two or more races.

There were 28 households, of which 35.7% had children under the age of 18 living with them, 53.6% were married couples living together, 7.1% had a female householder with no husband present, 3.6% had a male householder with no wife present, and 35.7% were non-families. 28.6% of all households were made up of individuals, and 10.7% had someone living alone who was 65 years of age or older. The average household size was 2.32 and the average family size was 2.89.

The median age in the town was 43.6 years. 23.1% of residents were under the age of 18; 3% were between the ages of 18 and 24; 30.8% were from 25 to 44; 30.9% were from 45 to 64; and 12.3% were 65 years of age or older. The gender makeup of the town was 52.3% male and 47.7% female.

=== 2000 census ===
As of the census of 2000, there were 75 people, 32 households, and 20 families residing in the town. The population density was 105.6 inhabitants per square mile (40.8/km^{2}). There were 34 housing units at an average density of 47.9 per square mile (18.5/km^{2}). The racial makeup of the town was 82.67% White, 12.00% Native American, 1.33% Asian, and 4.00% from two or more races. Hispanic or Latino of any race were 1.33% of the population.

There were 32 households, out of which 28.1% had children under the age of 18 living with them, 59.4% were married couples living together, 3.1% had a female householder with no husband present, and 34.4% were non-families. 34.4% of all households were made up of individuals, and 6.3% had someone living alone who was 65 years of age or older. The average household size was 2.34 and the average family size was 2.95.

In the town, the population was spread out, with 25.3% under the age of 18, 6.7% from 18 to 24, 34.7% from 25 to 44, 25.3% from 45 to 64, and 8.0% who were 65 years of age or older. The median age was 35 years. For every 100 females, there were 114.3 males. For every 100 females age 18 and over, there were 115.4 males.

The median income for a household in the town was $45,625, and the median income for a family was $50,833. Males had a median income of $28,333 versus $24,375 for females. The per capita income for the town was $15,619. There were no families and 8.7% of the population living below the poverty line, including no under eighteens and none of those over 64.

== Education ==
It is in the Brookings School District 05-1.
