= White, South Dakota =

- City
- Logo

- Location in Brookings County and the state of South Dakota
- Coordinates: 44°26′09″N 96°38′46″W
- Country: United States
- State: South Dakota
- County: Brookings
- Incorporated: 1887

Area
  - Total: 0.87 sq mi (2.26 km^{2})
  - Land: 0.87 sq mi (2.26 km^{2})
  - Water: 0 sq mi (0.00 km^{2})
- Elevation: 1,791 ft (546 m)

Population (2020)
  - Total: 537
  - Density: 614.8/sq mi (237.36/km^{2})
- Time zone: UTC-6 (Central (CST))
  - Summer (DST): UTC-5 (CDT)
- ZIP code: 57276
- Area code: 605
- FIPS code: 46-70940
- GNIS feature ID: 1267651
- Website: white.sdcity.gov

White is a city in Brookings County, South Dakota, United States. The population was 537 at the 2020 census.

== History ==
White was laid out in 1884, and named in honor of W. H. White, a first settler.

== Geography ==
According to the United States Census Bureau, the city has a total area of 0.99 square miles (2.56 km^{2}), all land.

== Demographics ==
Historical population
Census	Pop.	Note	%±
1890	137		—
1900	454		231.4%
1910	468		3.1%
1920	594		26.9%
1930	533		−10.3%
1940	559		4.9%
1950	525		−6.1%
1960	417		−20.6%
1970	418		0.2%
1980	474		13.4%
1990	536		13.1%
2000	530		−1.1%
2010	485		−8.5%
2020	537		10.7%
U.S. Decennial Census; 2018 Estimate

=== 2020 census ===
As of the 2020 census, White had a population of 537. The median age was 36.1 years. 25.9% of residents were under the age of 18 and 13.6% were 65 years of age or older. For every 100 females there were 97.4 males, and for every 100 females age 18 and over there were 92.3 males.

0.0% of residents lived in urban areas, while 100.0% lived in rural areas.

There were 231 households in White, of which 29.0% had children under the age of 18 living in them. Of all households, 49.4% were married-couple households, 17.3% were households with a male householder and no spouse or partner present, and 25.5% were households with a female householder and no spouse or partner present. About 30.3% of all households were made up of individuals and 11.2% had someone living alone who was 65 years of age or older.

There were 252 housing units, of which 8.3% were vacant. The homeowner vacancy rate was 0.0% and the rental vacancy rate was 13.8%.

Racial composition as of the 2020 census
Race	Number	Percent
White	525	97.8%
Black or African American	3	0.6%
American Indian and Alaska Native	0	0.0%
Asian	2	0.4%
Native Hawaiian and Other Pacific Islander	0	0.0%
Some other race	1	0.2%
Two or more races	6	1.1%
Hispanic or Latino (of any race)	2	0.4%

=== 2010 census ===
As of the census of 2010, there were 485 people, 195 households, and 121 families residing in the city. The population density was 489.9 inhabitants per square mile (189.2/km^{2}). There were 212 housing units at an average density of 214.1 per square mile (82.7/km^{2}). The racial makeup of the city was 98.4% White, 0.8% Asian, and 0.8% from two or more races. Hispanic or Latino of any race were 0.4% of the population.

There were 195 households, of which 28.7% had children under the age of 18 living with them, 49.7% were married couples living together, 8.7% had a female householder with no husband present, 3.6% had a male householder with no wife present, and 37.9% were non-families. 34.4% of all households were made up of individuals, and 9.8% had someone living alone who was 65 years of age or older. The average household size was 2.31 and the average family size was 2.98.

The median age in the city was 41.7 years. 23.7% of residents were under the age of 18; 7.5% were between the ages of 18 and 24; 23.3% were from 25 to 44; 24.7% were from 45 to 64; and 20.8% were 65 years of age or older. The gender makeup of the city was 50.1% male and 49.9% female.

=== 2000 census ===
As of the census of 2000, there were 530 people, 198 households, and 136 families residing in the city. The population density was 741.5 inhabitants per square mile (286.3/km^{2}). There were 212 housing units at an average density of 296.6 per square mile (114.5/km^{2}). The racial makeup of the city was 98.30% White, 0.19% African American, 0.75% Native American, and 0.75% from two or more races. Hispanic or Latino of any race were 1.32% of the population.

There were 198 households, out of which 35.4% had children under the age of 18 living with them, 56.6% were married couples living together, 8.6% had a female householder with no husband present, and 31.3% were non-families. 27.3% of all households were made up of individuals, and 14.6% had someone living alone who was 65 years of age or older. The average household size was 2.54 and the average family size was 3.02.

In the city, the population was spread out, with 27.0% under the age of 18, 9.6% from 18 to 24, 28.1% from 25 to 44, 16.0% from 45 to 64, and 19.2% who were 65 years of age or older. The median age was 34 years. For every 100 females, there were 85.3 males. For every 100 females age 18 and over, there were 88.8 males.

The median income for a household in the city was $31,528, and the median income for a family was $40,547. Males had a median income of $26,875 versus $18,750 for females. The per capita income for the city was $13,027. About 4.3% of families and 6.3% of the population were below the poverty line, including 11.0% of those under age 18 and 7.5% of those age 65 or over.

== Education ==
It is in the Deubrook School District 05-6.

== Notable person ==
- William L. McKnight, businessman and philanthropist.
