= Hemmingsen =

Hemmingsen is a Danish surname. Notable people with the surname include:

- Carsten Hemmingsen (born 1970), Danish footballer and manager
- Michael Hemmingsen (born 1967), Danish footballer and manager
- Niels Hemmingsen (1513–1600), Danish Lutheran theologian
- Piers Hemmingsen (born 1955), Canadian author and music historian
- Steve Hemmingsen, American television journalist

== See also ==
- Mount Hemmingsen, mountain of Antarctica
