= Volga, South Dakota =

- City
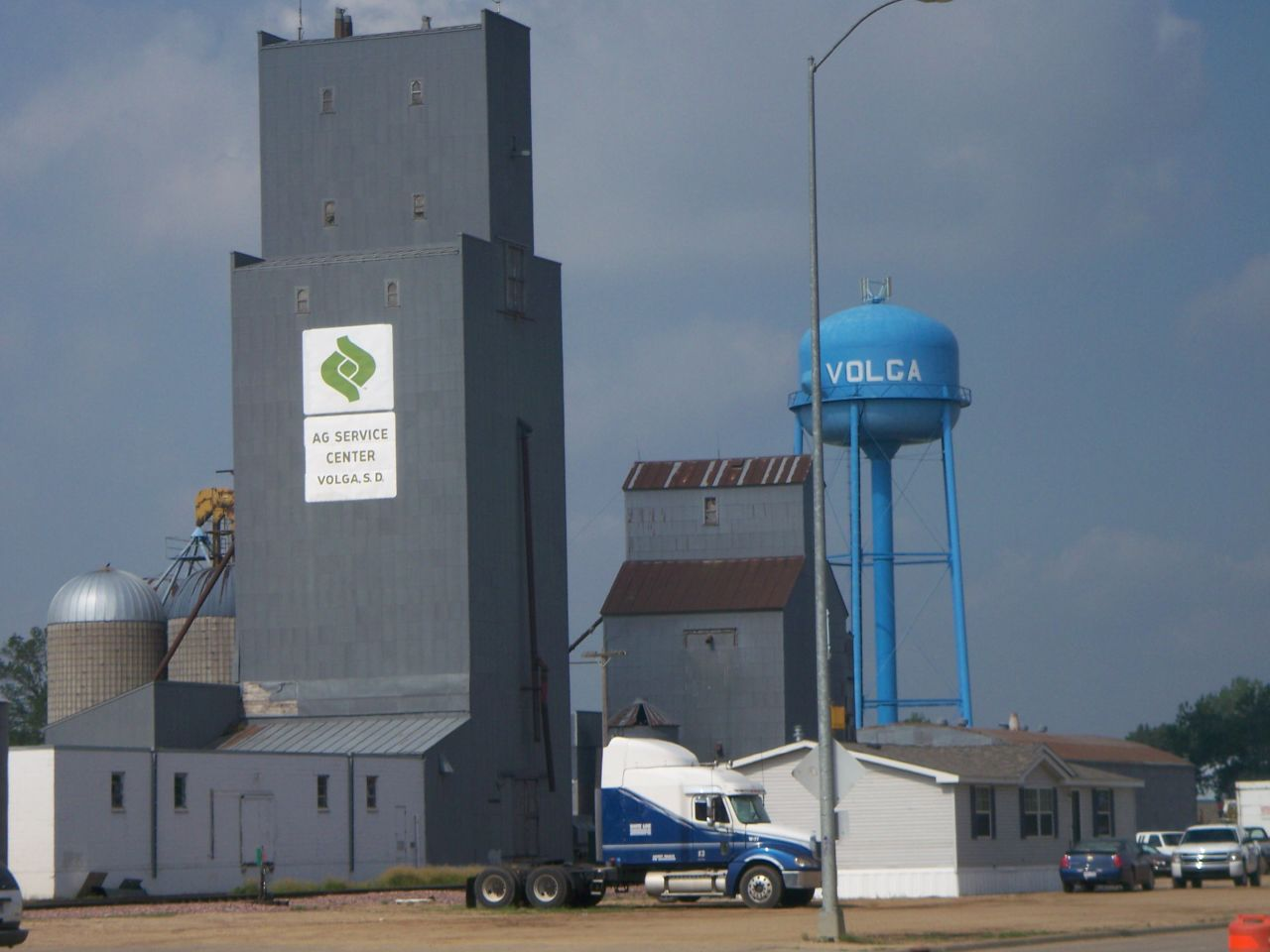
- The grain elevator and the water tower within Volga

- Logo
- Motto: "You'll love it here!"
- Location of Volga, South Dakota
- Coordinates: 44°19′18.67″N 96°55′20.14″W
- Country: United States
- State: South Dakota
- County: Brookings
- Founded: December 27, 1879
- Incorporated: July 10, 1903

Government
  - Mayor: Ken Fideler
  - City Council: Bev Cotton; Stacey Sahr; Matt Jaquet; Philip Madsen; Vicki VanderWal; Mike Larson

Area
  - City: 1.145 sq mi (2.965 km^{2})
  - Land: 1.145 sq mi (2.965 km^{2})
  - Water: 0 sq mi (0.000 km^{2})
- Elevation: 1,631 ft (497 m)

Population (2020)
  - City: 2,113
  - Estimate (2023): 2,340
  - Density: 2,045.5/sq mi (789.79/km^{2})
  - Metro: 35,980
- Time zone: UTC–6 (Central (CST))
  - Summer (DST): UTC–5 (CDT)
- ZIP Code: 57071
- Area code: 605
- FIPS code: 46-67700
- GNIS feature ID: 1267618
- Sales tax: 6.2%
- Website: volgacity.com

Volga (/ˈvɑːlɡə/ VAHL-guh) is a city in Brookings County, South Dakota, United States. The population was 2,113 at the 2020 census, and was estimated to be 2,340 in 2023.

== History ==
Volga was founded by the Western Town Lot Company on December 27, 1879, by Col. Arthur Jacoby, who had platted the area in September of that year. It was originally named "Bandy Town" after the Bandy family, early settlers there. In December 1879, the railroad assigned it the name "Volga", either after the Volga River in Russia, or the town (and river) of Volga, Iowa. From November 1879 to May 1880, Volga was at the end of the railroad, which stimulated the settlement's growth. By 1881, there were around 400 inhabitants. By the next year, Volga had five general stores and two hardware stores, as well as two hotels and three lumber yards. By sometime in the early 1880s, there were four hotels, chief of which was the Farrington. The lumber yard owned by the Laird, Norton Company was closed in 1884.

Volga is mentioned in the 1940 novel The Long Winter by Laura Ingalls Wilder in the chapter titled "Pa Goes to Volga".

In November 1994, it was decided that a soybean processing plant – expected to create 67 jobs – would be built in Volga. Groundbreaking took place in mid-1995. In September 1996, a $32.5 million soybean processing plant opened in Volga, the first such facility in South Dakota. Described as "a major agricultural hub in the Brookings area", it is able to process 85,000 bushels daily. The facility is operated by South Dakota Soybean Processors, who have since also opened a soybean plant near Miller, with plans for a plant in Mitchell. Prairie AquaTech, a fish feed company, built a facility to the south of the Volga plant in 2019.

== Geography ==
Volga is located at 44°19′18.67″N 96°55′20.14″W (44.3218528, -96.9222616).

According to the United States Census Bureau, the city has a total area of 1.145 square miles (2.97 km^{2}), all land. To the east of the city is the Big Sioux River, to the northwest is Lake Goldsmith.

== Demographics ==
Historical population
| Census | Pop. | Note | %± |
|---|---|---|---|
| 1880 | 287 | | — |
| 1890 | 298 | | 3.8% |
| 1900 | 396 | | 32.9% |
| 1910 | 568 | | 43.4% |
| 1920 | 600 | | 5.6% |
| 1930 | 604 | | 0.7% |
| 1940 | 632 | | 4.6% |
| 1950 | 578 | | −8.5% |
| 1960 | 780 | | 34.9% |
| 1970 | 982 | | 25.9% |
| 1980 | 1,221 | | 24.3% |
| 1990 | 1,263 | | 3.4% |
| 2000 | 1,435 | | 13.6% |
| 2010 | 1,768 | | 23.2% |
| 2020 | 2,113 | | 19.5% |
| 2023 (est.) | 2,340 | | 10.7% |
U.S. Decennial Census; 2020 Census

As of the 2023 American Community Survey, there are 936 estimated households in Volga with an average of 2.40 persons per household. The city has a median household income of $75,417. Approximately 7.5% of the city's population lives at or below the poverty line. Volga has an estimated 76.7% employment rate, with 41.6% of the population holding a bachelor's degree or higher and 98.8% holding a high school diploma.

The top five reported ancestries (people were allowed to report up to two ancestries, thus the figures will generally add to more than 100%) were English (97.9%), Spanish (0.6%), Indo-European (0.7%), Asian and Pacific Islander (0.8%), and Other (0.0%).

The median age in the city was 29.0 years.

=== Racial and ethnic composition ===
Volga, South Dakota – racial and ethnic composition Note: the US Census treats Hispanic/Latino as an ethnic category. This table excludes Latinos from the racial categories and assigns them to a separate category. Hispanics/Latinos may be of any race.
| Race / ethnicity (NH = non-Hispanic) | Pop. 2000 | Pop. 2010 | Pop. 2020 | % 2000 | % 2010 | % 2020 |
|---|---|---|---|---|---|---|
| White alone (NH) | 1,412 | 1,702 | 1,917 | 98.40% | 96.27% | 90.72% |
| Black or African American alone (NH) | 0 | 1 | 13 | 0.00% | 0.06% | 0.62% |
| Native American or Alaska Native alone (NH) | 6 | 7 | 22 | 0.42% | 0.40% | 1.04% |
| Asian alone (NH) | 3 | 5 | 5 | 0.21% | 0.28% | 0.24% |
| Pacific Islander alone (NH) | 0 | 0 | 0 | 0.00% | 0.00% | 0.00% |
| Other race alone (NH) | 0 | 0 | 3 | 0.00% | 0.00% | 0.14% |
| Mixed race or multiracial (NH) | 8 | 6 | 47 | 0.56% | 0.34% | 2.22% |
| Hispanic or Latino (any race) | 6 | 47 | 106 | 0.42% | 2.66% | 5.02% |
| Total | 1,435 | 1,768 | 2,113 | 100.00% | 100.00% | 100.00% |

=== 2020 census ===
As of the 2020 census, there were 2,113 people, 872 households, and 542 families residing in the city. The population density was 1,896.8 inhabitants per square mile (732.4/km^{2}). There were 938 housing units at an average density of 842.0 per square mile (325.1/km^{2}).

The median age was 35.2 years. 26.3% of residents were under the age of 18 and 15.1% of residents were 65 years of age or older.

For every 100 females there were 99.2 males, and for every 100 females age 18 and over there were 99.9 males age 18 and over.

There were 872 households in Volga, of which 31.0% had children under the age of 18 living in them. Of all households, 51.0% were married-couple households, 20.5% were households with a male householder and no spouse or partner present, and 22.9% were households with a female householder and no spouse or partner present. About 31.4% of all households were made up of individuals and 12.0% had someone living alone who was 65 years of age or older.

Of the 938 housing units, 7.0% were vacant. The homeowner vacancy rate was 1.5% and the rental vacancy rate was 7.9%.

0.0% of residents lived in urban areas, while 100.0% lived in rural areas.

Racial composition as of the 2020 census
| Race | Number | Percent |
|---|---|---|
| White | 1,945 | 92.0% |
| Black or African American | 13 | 0.6% |
| American Indian and Alaska Native | 22 | 1.0% |
| Asian | 5 | 0.2% |
| Native Hawaiian and Other Pacific Islander | 0 | 0.0% |
| Some other race | 62 | 2.9% |
| Two or more races | 66 | 3.1% |
| Hispanic or Latino (of any race) | 106 | 5.0% |

=== 2010 census ===
As of the 2010 census, there were 1,768 people, 734 households, and 483 families residing in the city. The population density was 1,942.9 inhabitants per square mile (750.2/km^{2}). There were 783 housing units at an average density of 860.4 per square mile (332.2/km^{2}). The racial makeup of the city was 98.25% White, 0.28% African American, 0.40% Native American, 0.28% Asian, 0.00% Pacific Islander, 0.34% from some other races and 0.45% from two or more races. Hispanic or Latino people of any race were 2.66% of the population.

There were 734 households, of which 32.7% had children under the age of 18 living with them, 53.5% were married couples living together, 7.9% had a female householder with no husband present, 4.4% had a male householder with no wife present, and 34.2% were non-families. 28.5% of all households were made up of individuals, and 11% had someone living alone who was 65 years of age or older. The average household size was 2.41 and the average family size was 2.98.

The median age in the city was 33.8 years. 26.5% of residents were under the age of 18; 7.7% were between the ages of 18 and 24; 30.2% were from 25 to 44; 22.2% were from 45 to 64; and 13.5% were 65 years of age or older. The gender makeup of the city was 49.2% male and 50.8% female.

=== 2000 census ===
As of the 2000 census, there were 1,435 people, 571 households, and 413 families residing in the city. The population density was 1,862.1 inhabitants per square mile (719.0/km^{2}). There were 596 housing units at an average density of 773.4 per square mile (298.6/km^{2}). The racial makeup of the city was 98.75% White, 0.00% African American, 0.42% Native American, 0.21% Asian, 0.00% Pacific Islander, 0.00% from some other races and 0.63% from two or more races. Hispanic or Latino people of any race were 0.42% of the population.

There were 571 households, out of which 37.1% had children under the age of 18 living with them, 61.5% were married couples living together, 8.9% had a female householder with no husband present, and 27.5% were non-families. 24.7% of all households were made up of individuals, and 11.2% had someone living alone who was 65 years of age or older. The average household size was 2.51 and the average family size was 3.03.

In the city, the population was spread out, with 27.9% under the age of 18, 7.8% from 18 to 24, 30.8% from 25 to 44, 20.7% from 45 to 64, and 12.8% who were 65 years of age or older. The median age was 34 years. For every 100 females, there were 92.9 males. For every 100 females age 18 and over, there were 90.3 males.

As of 2000 the median income for a household in the city was $41,818, and the median income for a family was $51,131. Males had a median income of $31,083 versus $23,190 for females. The per capita income for the city was $18,237. About 3.4% of families and 6.2% of the population were below the poverty line, including 10.1% of those under age 18 and 8.7% of those age 65 or over.

== Culture ==
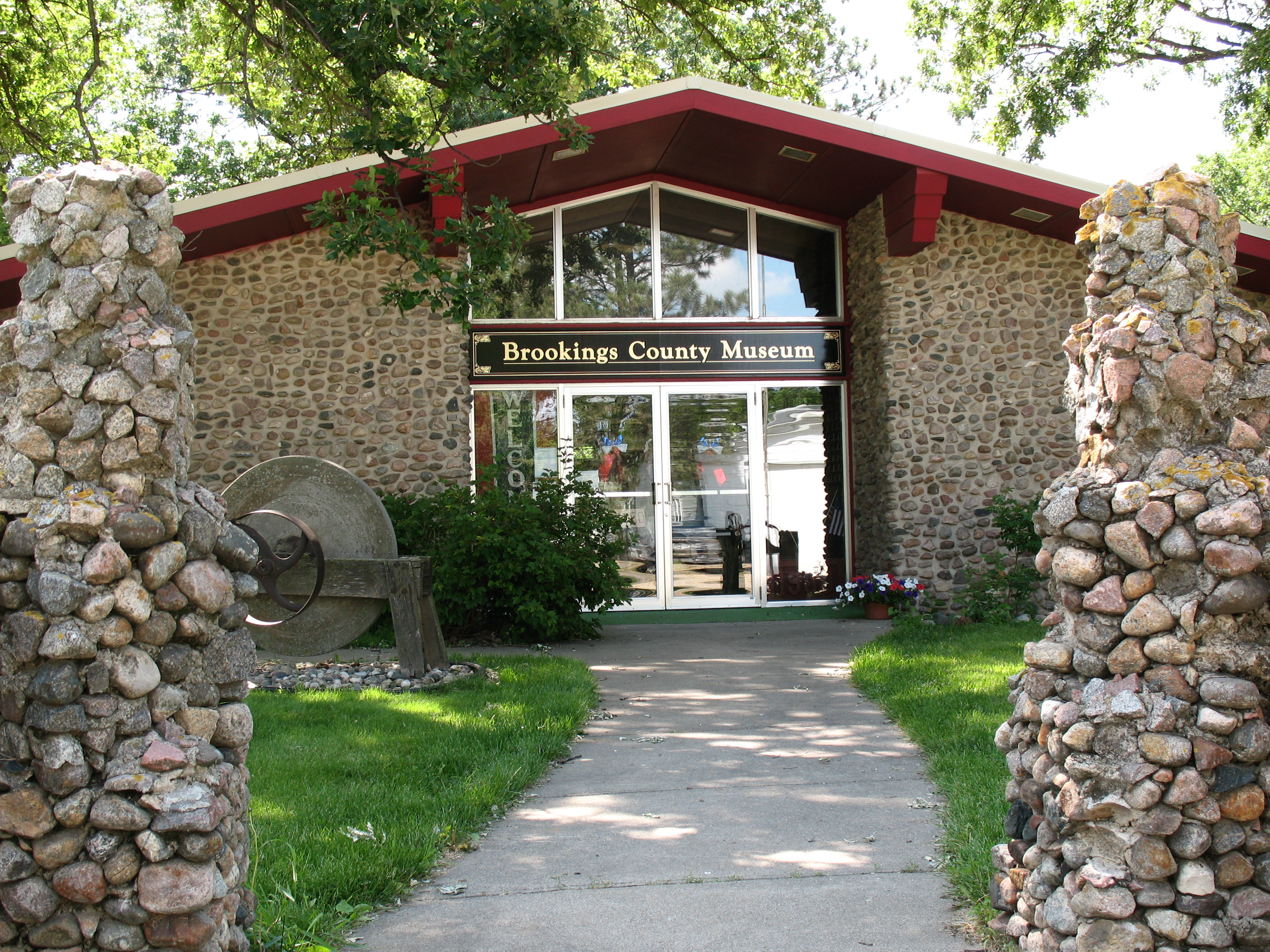
The Brookings County Museum in Volga

Old Timers Day in Volga occurs in the second week of June every year and is capped off by an over-21-only street dance and many private parties.

=== Points of interest ===
There are four places in Volga listed on the National Register of Historic Places: the Henry-Martinson House (added in 1977), the Volga Auditorium (added in 2000), the John L. Hall House (added in 2010) and the Volga Hospital (added in 2023).

The Brookings County Museum, consisting of six buildings, is situated in Volga City Park. The museum contains around 5,000 artifacts related to the county's history. It was initially set up in the Brookings County Courthouse, in 1939. In 1965, Volga's City Council provided the Brookings County Historical Society land for a museum. The museum moved to Volga, opening at its present location in July 1969. The 1872 Sundet Log Cabin – previously ten miles south of Brookings – was also relocated there, in 1973. The Trygve Trooien Horse-Drawn Museum was opened in May 2018. The museum complex also includes a 19th century one-room rural school, the Vintage Farm Equipment building, and the James Hauxhurst House.

The 106-acre Meadow Creek Golf Course is located to the south. Since December 2019, it has been within city limits, due to being annexed.

Schadé Vineyard is a winery to the west of Volga, founded in 2000.

== Infrastructure ==
Volga is located on U.S. Route 14. The Dakota, Minnesota and Eastern Railroad serves Volga, passing through it.

== Education ==
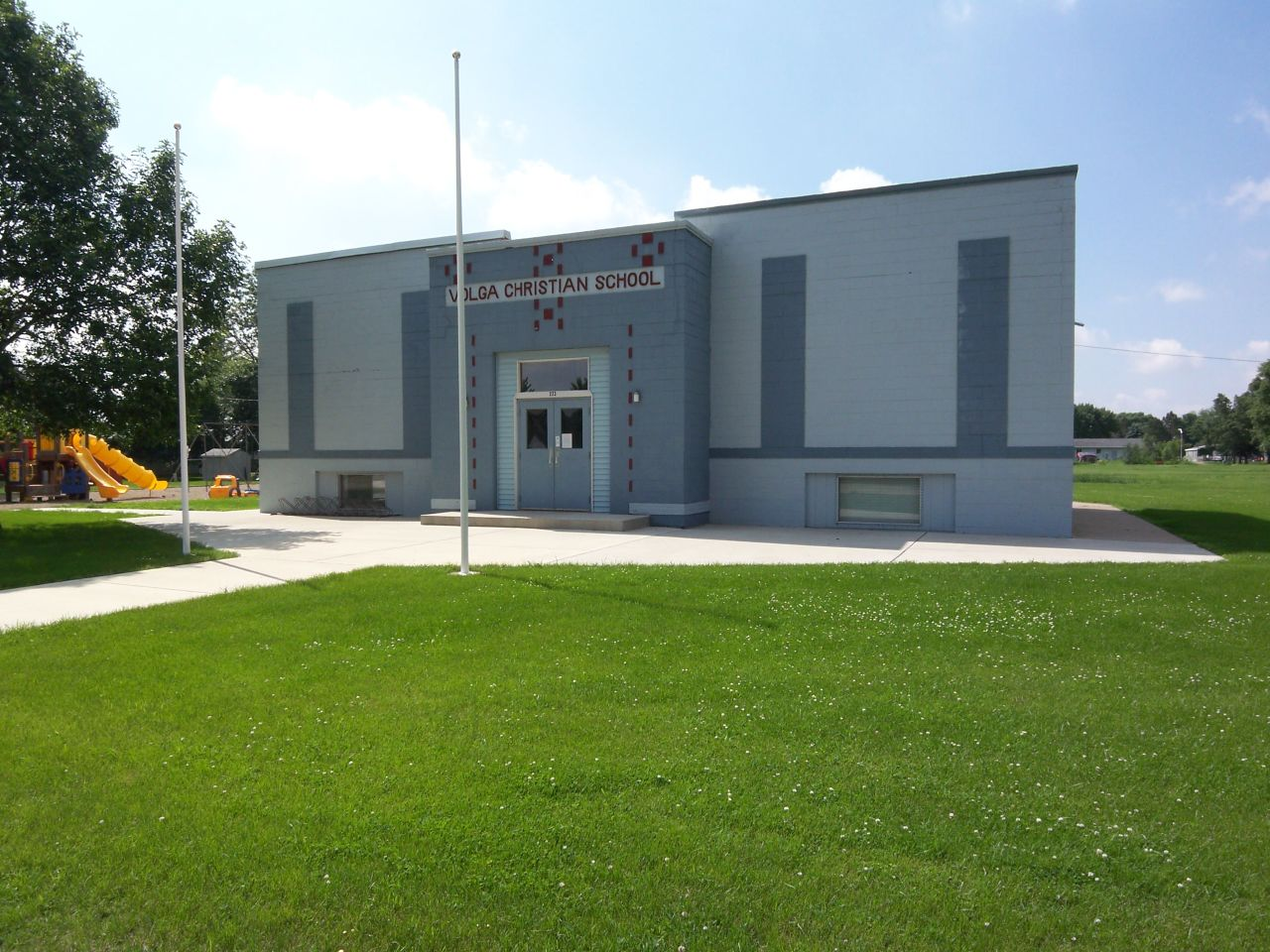
Volga Christian School

=== Public schools ===
Volga is served by the Sioux Valley School District. The district has one elementary school, one middle school, and one high school. Students attend Sioux Valley High School. Three communities are included in the Sioux Valley school system: Bruce, Sinai, and Volga.

The Sioux Valley Cossacks football team is traditionally one of the strongest teams in the 11B classification.

As of 2020, the Sioux Valley Cossacks competitive cheer team has won 14 consecutive State A Cheer titles.

=== Private schools ===
Volga also has a private K through 8th school called the Volga Christian School.

== Media ==
=== Newspapers ===
The Volga Tribune is a local weekly newspaper that has been published since 1882.

=== Radio ===
The KBRK radio station has been broadcasting in the Brookings area since 1955. KV91 (KVAA) was founded with its studios in Volga in 1983. It changed its call sign to KJJQ in 1985, moving its studios into an old railroad depot in Brookings in 1990.

== Notable people ==
- Doug Lund, news anchor for KELO-TV
- Del Paddock, Major League Baseball player

== See also ==
- List of cities in South Dakota
