= KBRK =

KBRK may refer to:

- KBRK (AM), a radio station (1430 AM) licensed to Brookings, South Dakota, United States
- KBRK-FM, a radio station (93.7 FM) licensed to Brookings, South Dakota, United States
