= Sioux Valley High School =

Location
- 200 Hansina Ave; Volga, South Dakota 57071; United States; 44.3221°N 96.9203°W

Information
- School type: Public, Secondary
- Established: 1882
- Principal: Tyler Bolstad
- Faculty: 12.43 (FTE)
- Grades: 9–12
- Enrollment: 224 (2022–2023)
- Student to teacher ratio: 18.02
- Colors: Navy and gold
- Mascot: Cossack
- Website: Sioux Valley High

Sioux Valley High School is a high school located in Volga, South Dakota, United States.

== History ==
The Sioux Valley High School was consolidated in 1960. Three towns, Bruce, Sinai and Volga, consolidated and became the Sioux Valley School District. At one time there was talk of a master school district that would involve the towns of Bruce, White and Brookings.

== Campus ==
The school facilities can accommodate up to 600 students.

== Extracurricular activities ==
=== Athletics ===
All of the school's sports are in the class A division except for American football which is in class 11B and golf and wrestling which are in class B. The school mascot is the Cossack.

The following is a list of athletic teams:

- Cross country
- American Football
- Volleyball
- Girls' basketball
- Boys' basketball
- Wrestling
- Track
- Golf
- Competitive cheer
