= Children's Museum of South Dakota =

Children's museum in Brookings, South Dakota

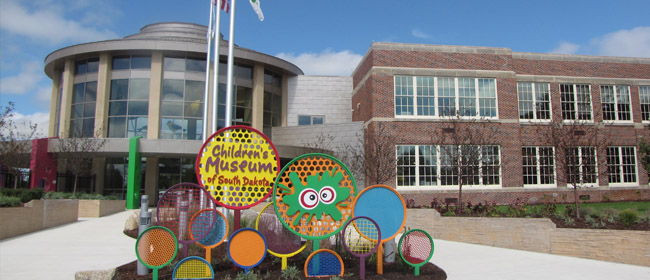

- Location within South Dakota
- Established: 2010
- Location: 521 4th St, Brookings, South Dakota, U.S.
- Coordinates: 44.3094°N 96.7963°W
- Director: Kate Trieber
- Website: The Children's Museum of South Dakota

The Children's Museum of South Dakota is a children's museum located in Brookings, South Dakota. Founded in 2010 in a renovated Brookings elementary school, The Children's Museum of South Dakota's 44,000 square foot building contains over 5,000 "loose parts," and is supported by both an outdoor playground and a cafeteria, Café Coteau. It includes several year-round play areas, as well as "Mama," one of the only full-size permanent, animatronic T. rex specimens in the United States, and an interactive "stickwork" installation by Patrick Dougherty called Tangle Town.

The Children's Museum of South Dakota is a non-profit organization, managed and supported through an endowment from The Dale and Pat Larson family foundation. The museum sees more than 100,000 visitors annually.
