= KKQQ =

- Volga, South Dakota; United States
- Broadcast area: Brookings, South Dakota
- Frequency: 102.3 MHz
- Branding: K-Country 102.3

Programming
- Format: Country

Ownership
- Owner: Connoisseur Media; (Alpha 3E Licensee LLC)
- Sister stations: KBRK (AM); KBRK-FM; KDBX; KJJQ

History
- First air date: 1984

Technical information
- Facility ID: 9663
- Class: C3
- ERP: 25,000 watts
- HAAT: 74 meters (243 ft)
- Transmitter coordinates: 44°15′0.9″N 96°57′23.2″W

Links
- Webcast: Listen live
- Website: www.kcountry102.com

KKQQ (102.3 FM, "K Country 102.3") is a country music station in the Brookings, South Dakota, area. The station's transmitter is located in the nearby town of Volga, but the studios are in Brookings. K Country 102.3 broadcasts across a range of eastern South Dakota encompassing the cities of Clear Lake, Dell Rapids, DeSmet, Hendricks, Minnesota, and the region between. The station was formerly in a historic train depot. In 2005, the depot was sold and KKQQ relocated to the building now housing the other four commercial radio stations in Brookings.

== Format ==
K Country 102.3 plays country music from 2000 to today. The station is also the home of Brookings Bobcat athletics.
