= KBRK-FM =

Radio station in Brookings, South Dakota

- Brookings, South Dakota; United States
- Broadcast area: Brookings, South Dakota
- Frequency: 93.7 MHz
- Branding: B93.7

Programming
- Format: Hot adult contemporary
- Affiliations: Premiere Networks; Sioux Valley High School; Sioux Valley School District

Ownership
- Owner: Connoisseur Media; (Alpha 3E License, LLC)
- Sister stations: KBRK (AM); KDBX; KJJQ; KKQQ

History
- First air date: 1968
- Call sign meaning: Brookings

Technical information
- Facility ID: 15261
- Class: C1
- ERP: 100,000 watts
- HAAT: 174 meters (571 ft)
- Transmitter coordinates: 44°20′21.8″N 97°9′17.2″W

Links
- Webcast: Listen live
- Website: www.myb937.com

KBRK-FM (93.7 MHz, "B93.7") is a radio station broadcasting a hot adult contemporary music format. The station is licensed to serve Brookings in the U.S. state of South Dakota. The station is owned by Connoisseur Media, through licensee Alpha 3E License, LLC.

Former logo

On weekends, KBRK airs the hot AC version of the syndicated American Top 40.
