= Maggie Thompson (artist) =

Native American textile artist and designer

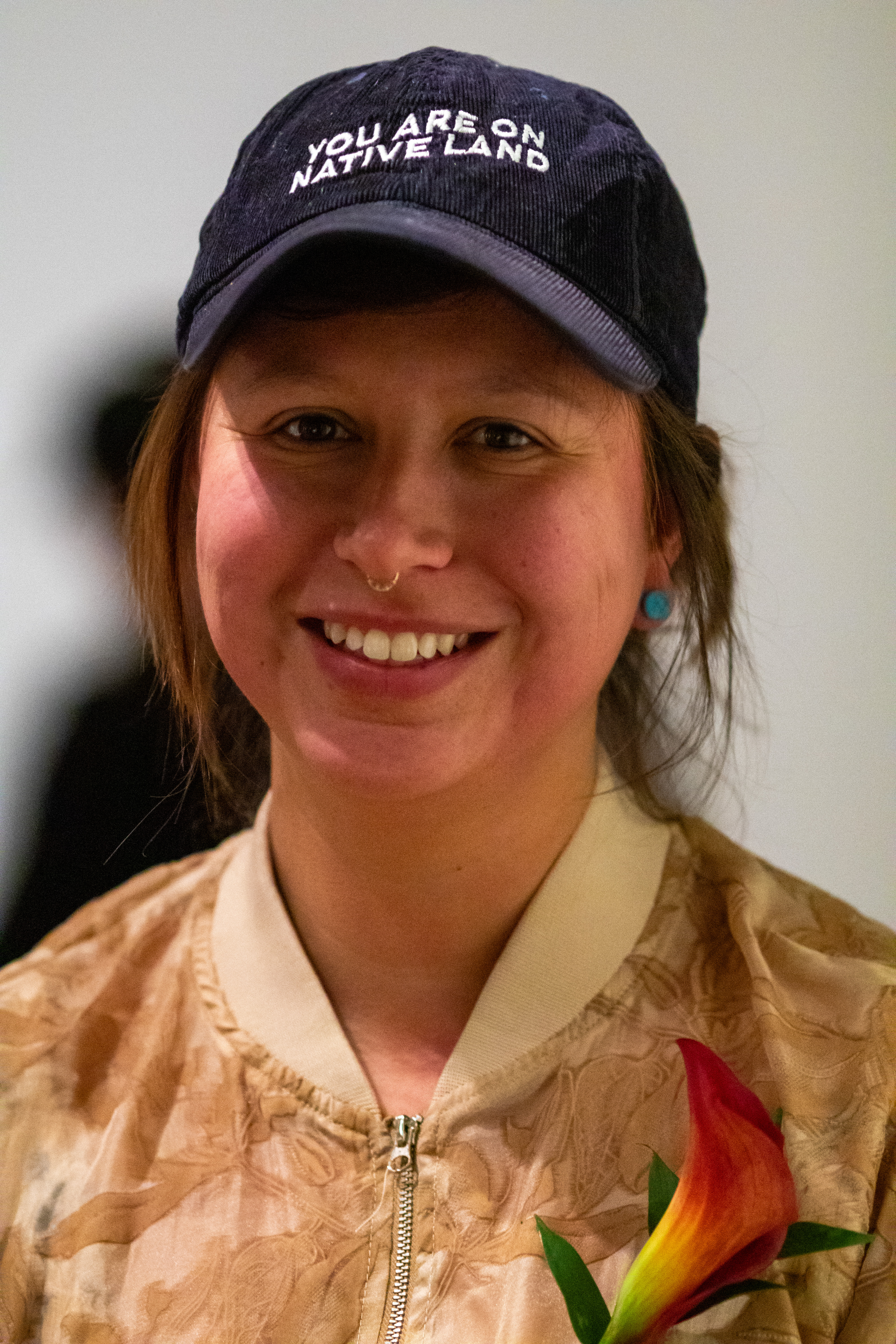
- Thompson at the Smithsonian American Art Museum, 2024
- Occupation: Textile artist

Maggie Thompson is a Native American textile artist and designer from the Fond du Lac Ojibwe with a focus on "knitwear and tapestry". Her work focuses on her heritage and identity and also addresses cultural appropriation and Native authenticity. She is the director of the Two Rivers Gallery in Minneapolis,

Thompson incorporates multimedia elements into her pieces, such as photographs, beer caps, and 3-D printed designs. She weaves Ojibwe designs into her work to represent her Native heritage. She lives in Minneapolis and owns Makwa Studio, a small knitwear business.

== Biography ==
Catherine "Maggie" Thompson was born October 5, 1989 into the Fond du Lac Ojibwe in Minneapolis, Minnesota. Her father was a graphic designer of Fond du Lac Ojibwe heritage and her mother is a painter and photographer of Irish and German heritage. She has stated that her mixed heritage made it hard to find her identity, as she found it difficult to fit in with others around her. She enjoyed skateboarding and rollerskating during her youth, which had an impact on her art. Thompson studied architecture in college, but was introduced to the textile program there during her fourth year, where she "fell in love with fibers." She graduated with a Bachelor of Fine Arts in Textiles from the Rhode Island School of Design in 2013.

The following year Thompson's father died; he had been diagnosed with pancreatic cancer after experiencing a seizure. His death inspired her to create artwork such as the Body Bag project. Her father and mother were her biggest inspirations, along with her close friend Jacob Riley Wasserman. Thompson has stated that Wasserman, who attended college with her at the Rhode Island School of Design, taught her "the true meaning of what love can be in a friendship".

Thompson believes that she can tell a story from her artwork and wants her audience to understand the narrative from the "symbolism objects and possible phrasing that are found within her work". Thompson is also "challenging limitations of what 'native art' should or should not be" with her work. In 2014 Thompson founded Makwa Studio, named after the Ojibwe word for bear, which represents her father's clan, and creates knitwear suitable to be worn by non-Native Americans.

== Artworks ==
- Family Portrait in this piece Thompson creates three panels that represent the blood quantum, which is "the percentage of Indian blood" within her family. In the first panel it shows that her father is seventy five percent filled, which is representing how much Indian blood he has. The panel to the right is her mother's panel which as no blood quantum filled in since Thompson's mother is Irish and German. The middle panel represents Thompson's blood quantum which shows that she is less than fifty percent Native American "which makes Thompson just three-eighths Ojibwe". This piece was created in 2012 using Rayon, wool and dye and was displayed in the Minneapolis Institute of Art, in the exhibit Fresh Water: Contemporary Native Artist from our Great Lakes from May 9, 2015, to February 21, 2016. Thompson's inspiration for this piece was her mixed heritage. Since she was always questioning herself, the question sparked her inspiration for this particular piece. Thompson considers herself to be White, coming from a father who's seventy-five percent Ojibwe and a mother who has no Native blood. Although she is less than fifty percent Native American, Thompson still identifies as being a Native American. The purpose of this piece allowed Thompson to explore and "question ideas and system of authenticity."

Detail of On Loving (2022–2023), from the series Body Bag, at the Renwick Gallery in 2023

- Body Bag project was inspired by Thompson's father dying. The night he died, "watching the coroners carried him away in a simple solid-colored bag" inspired her to create a bag and give it more of a happy feeling. The theme of this piece is her grievance, loss of her father as well as exploring her Native Ojibwe heritage. This piece was displayed in the Freeborn County Arts Initiative. The body bag was created with black vinyl and is star quilt sewed out of vinyl including the color green, blue, red, orange, yellow, and white triangles in the center of the bag as well as wraps around the bag. This particular design is inspired by a star quilt that her mother gave her father when they married. Thompson created this for her father as a form of honoring her father as well as saying goodbye. The textiles represented "the contain memory to reflect and tell a difficult story".
- Assumptions is a piece in her collection Where I fit. Thompson explores her native heritage and clarifies some assumptions made by those who aren't Native American. The mixed media piece was created with bottle caps that are woven into an Ojibwe design. The purpose of this piece is to show how the stereotype of alcoholism has affected Native American culture.

== Exhibitions and collections ==
Thompson has a few pieces that are in the permanent collections of the Minnesota Historical Society. Her works have also been part of exhibitions at the Minnesota Museum of American Art, McKnight Foundation, Minneapolis Institute of Art (2015), and the Plains Art Museum (2015). She has also exhibited at the following locations:

- Where I fit, All My Relations Gallery, Minneapolis Minnesota, 2014
- On borrowed Time, Minnesota Textile Center, Minneapolis, MN
- For Love Alone Freeborn County Arts Initiative, Albert Lea, MN
- Forgiving our Fathers My Relations Arts, Minneapolis, MN, 2014

In 2023,

- "Sharing Honors and Burdens: Renwick Invitational 2023", Renwick Gallery Smithsonian Institution. May 26, 2023 - March 31, 2024.

== Honors and awards ==
In 2015 Thompson received the NACF Regional Artist Fellowship as well as the Minnesota State Arts Board Cultural Community Partnership Grant.
