= Geraldine Fenn =

Children's rights advocate

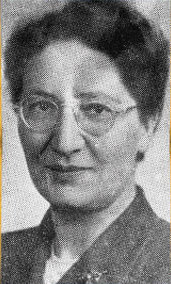
Geraldine Fenn

Geraldine "Gerry" Fenn (April 1, 1912 – September 14, 1989) was an American educator. Fenn founded the Montanans for Children, Youth and Families in 1978, and framed the 1972 Montana State Constitution setting forth rights for children, a bill that became a model for other state constitutions.

== Early life ==
Fenn was born on April 1, 1912, and grew up in a farm in Brookings, South Dakota.

She graduated from Brookings High School, and then attended South Dakota State College. In 1929 she was a delegate to the National 4-H Congress in Chicago. In 1933 Fenn graduated with honors in home economics and music from South Dakota State University, obtained a master's degree from George Washington University, Washington, D.C., and did post-graduate works at Colorado State University, Cornell University, New York School for Social Research and Montana State University.

Later in life Fenn was honored as a distinguished alumnus (in 1965) and received an honorary doctor of humanities degree (in 1971) by the South Dakota State University.

== Career ==
At first Fenn taught music and home economics in Castlewood, South Dakota, later becoming principal of the school. She subsequently joined the 4-H International program at South Dakota State University. In 1946 she moved to Montana State University.

Fenn was with Montana State University from 1946 to 1967, later becoming associate professor emeritus. She was head of 4-H international programs and acted as Extension liaison with the Peace Corps. In 1950 she was a visiting youth specialist in home economics in Germany and in the 1960s she trained with the Peace Corps volunteers in Ecuador. Due to her work in international education, Montana State University sent one of the first delegates on the International Farm Youth Exchanges program to Europe soon after World War II. Fenn advocated equality for all people, and supported racial integration and the rights of children.

In 1953 she visited 12 countries to study the impact of International Cultural Exchange Program participants once they returned home and she often entertained international families in her home. In 1986 she was honored at the national International Cultural Exchange Program.

In 1964 she assisted with the Project Lessons project on Race Relations. In particular she highlighted the many Native American things that have been absorbed into the common culture, agricultural products, medicines, type of government, love of outdoors and games.

She retired in 1967 and served on Montana's Human Resource Council until 1977. She founded the People Partner Program in 1975, administered by the Montana 4-H Foundation to help youth groups working on community projects.

She participated at the Encampment for Citizenship, a program bringing together children from mainstream America, African Americans, and other minorities. Fenn in particular advocated for inclusion of children from Montana, including Native American children, and in 1967 she managed to have the encampment in Great Falls, Montana.

In 1969 she was appointed as Community Planning Coordinator for the first project of the new Montana Council on Human Resources. Her task was to facilitate Montana's efforts with children and youth in connection with the 1970 White House program.

Working with youth and families since 1933, in 1978 she founded the Montanans for Children, Youth and Families. She became the director and unpaid executive secretary of the association. The pushing factor for founding the association was the 1977 Legislature that did not fund the Montana Advisory Council on Children and Youth of which Fenn was the secretary for since 1969.

In 1980 she was a delegate to the White House conference on families.

In 2002 she was inducted into the National 4-H Hall of Fame. She received the Epsilon Sigma Phi distinguished alumnus award.

== Personal life ==
Fenn died in Bozeman, Montana, in 1989, and is buried at Greenwood Cemetery, Brookings, South Dakota.

== Legacy ==
The Gerry Fenn library was established in 1986 and is part of the Montana State University Women's Center.

At her death she left a sizeable estate to two associations: $134,957 to the Montana 4-H Foundation with the interest to be used in perpetuity to provide support for the International 4-H Youth Exchange and People Partners.

Fenn established the Geraldine Fenn Scholarship Fund for home economics at South Dakota State University.
