= Doug Lund =

American news anchor (1946–2024)

Doug Lund (1946 – May 21, 2024) was an American news anchor for KELO-TV in Sioux Falls, South Dakota.

== Biography ==
Lund grew up in Volga, South Dakota. He reported that the personalities at KELO-TV were his childhood idols.

In 1974, Doug Lund started his career at KELO-TV as a commercial announcer. In 1975, he joined the Keloland news team; and, he and Steve Hemmingsen co-anchored of the 10pm newscast. Beginning in 1977, Lund and Hemmingsen co-anchored the 6 p.m. newscast for twenty-five years. In June 2000, Lund assumed a senior anchor position at KELO-TV, and his anchored newscast grew in viewership by 25 percent over the next year.

In 2001, Lund was part of a five-person cohort from KELO-TV to receive an Upper Midwest Emmy Award for Single Newscast. He received the 2006 Tom Brokaw Award from the South Dakota Broadcasting Hall of Fame. His last newscast was on December 29, 2006; to commemorate his career, KELO-TV aired a segment titled Lund at Large Special.

Lund died from bladder cancer on May 21, 2024, at the age of 78.
