= Jennifer Angus =

Canadian artist

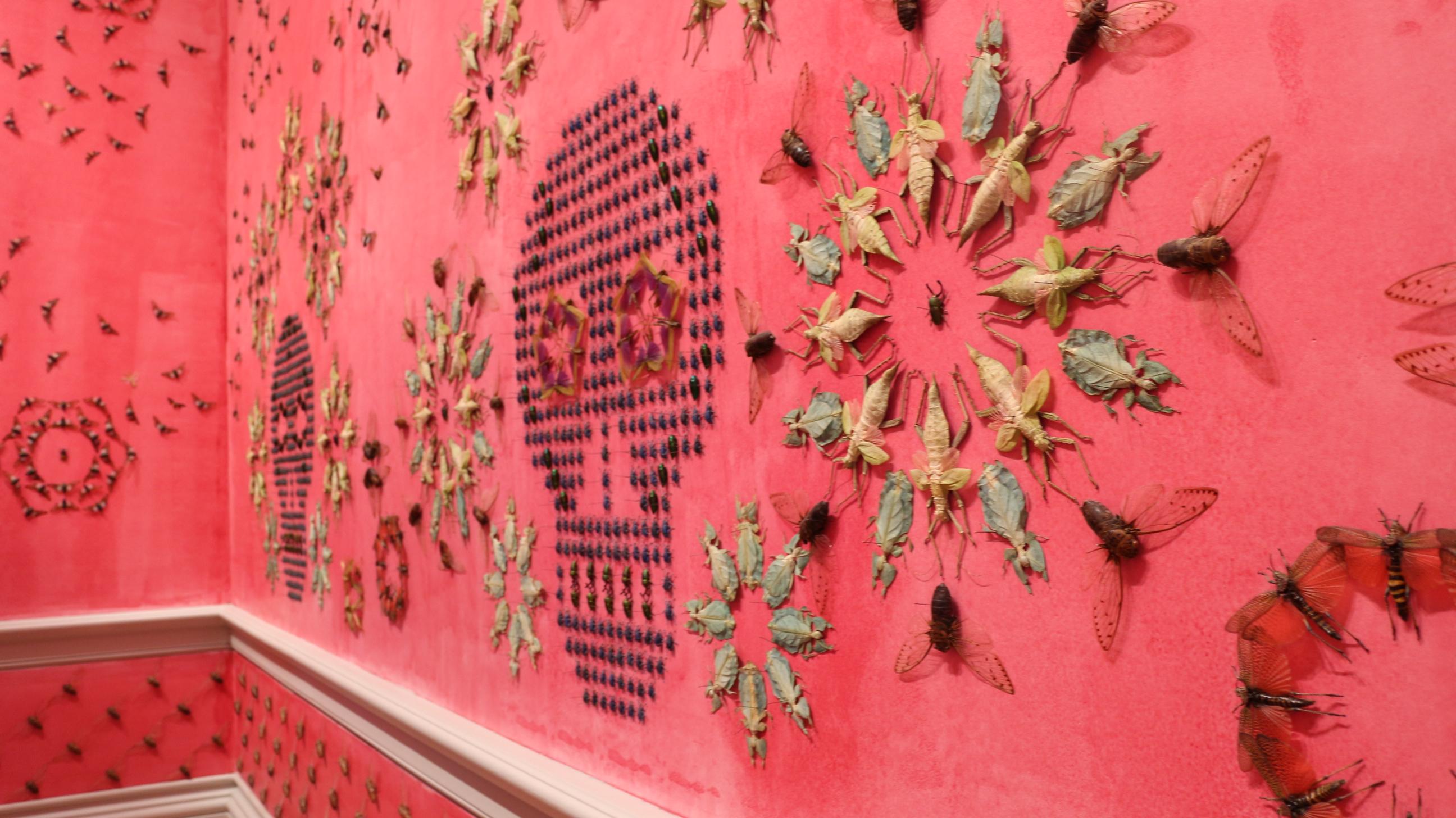
Jennifer Angus's "In the Midnight Garden" installation at Renwick Gallery, 2016.

Jennifer Angus (born 1961 in Edmonton, Alberta) is a Canadian artist, professor, and author. She is known for her site-specific installations that use large numbers of insects arranged in ornamental patterns that she has been creating since 1999. Angus anthropomorphizes insects in the hope that she can change people's entomophobia and create an interest in the role that insects play in ecosystems.

Angus is a professor in the Design Studies department at the University of Wisconsin, Madison. Angus lives and works in Madison, Wisconsin.

Angus is an alumna of the Nova Scotia College of Art and Design (BFA) and the School of the Art Institute of Chicago (MFA).

In 2005, the Textile Museum of Canada showed A terrible beauty, a site-specific installation involving 15,000 insects organized in ornamental patterns similar to those found on wallpaper and textiles. The exhibition won the 2006 Exhibition Award from the Ontario Association of Art Galleries.

Bravo commissioned a short documentary called Touch of Weevil – The Work of Jennifer Angus documenting one of her installations at the Tom Thomson Art Gallery in 2008.

In 2015, Angus participated in the exhibition Wonder, that celebrated the reopening of the Smithsonian's Renwick Gallery in Washington, D.C., with a site-specific installation called The Midnight Garden that used sustainably harvested insects. At the Wonder exhibition at the Renwick Gallery, Angus's installation consisted of about 5,000 dried insects. Work by Angus is in the collection of the Museum of Arts and Design and the fibre art collection of Idea Exchange.

Angus is the author of the 2013 fantasy novel, In Search of Goliathus Hercules, which tells the Victorian-era story of a young boy who discovers that he can speak to insects and sets out to find a giant insect on the Malay Peninsula.
