= Kim Schmahmann =

South African artist

- Born: 1955 (age 69–70); Johannesburg, South Africa
- Website: https://kimschmahmann.com/

Kim Schmahmann (born 1955 in Johannesburg, South Africa) is an artist who currently resides in Cambridge, Massachusetts. His studio is located in the Brickbottom Artists Building in Somerville, Massachusetts.

== Art Style ==
His art combines conceptual art with fine art, utilizing the tension that exists between the idea and the craft to express the tension that arises between individuals and society. Many of his pieces comment on the institutionalized control and discrimination that he witnessed growing up in South Africa, a country dominated by systems of oppression from its colonial past through the apartheid regime.

== Works ==
His iconic piece, the "Bureau of Bureaucracy," is permanently on display at the Smithsonian Renwick Gallery in Washington, DC. This piece took six years (from 1993 to 1999) to create at the MIT Hobby Shop in Cambridge. In October 2019, the Bureau of Bureaucracy was named one of the "Five Pieces at Smithsonian Museums and Galleries You Shouldn't Miss" by the Association of Registrars and Collection Specialists (ARCS).

His piece entitled "Apart-Hate: A People Divider," was acquired by the Museum of Arts & Design in New York City. The piece has appeared in MAD's Re: Collection exhibition curated by David Revere McFadden, as well as the Global Africa Project exhibition curated by Lowery Stokes Sims and Leslie King-Hammond. The Apart-Hate piece reflects on how societies create systems that divide people with hate. Judith Dobrzynski, writing for The New York Times, described the work as a "meditation on discrimination."

A recent piece, entitled "Belabeled" and acquired by the Peabody Essex Museum (PEM) in Salem MA, is about the power of labels to shape identity. These labels—those that people put on themselves and those others give them—frame expectations and limit possibilities. In exploring how labels matter, this piece invites viewers to challenge and reflect on their preconceived judgments.
