= McCrory Gardens and South Dakota Arboretum =

Botanical gardens and arboretum in Brookings, South Dakota

Coordinates: 44°18′46″N 96°46′12″W

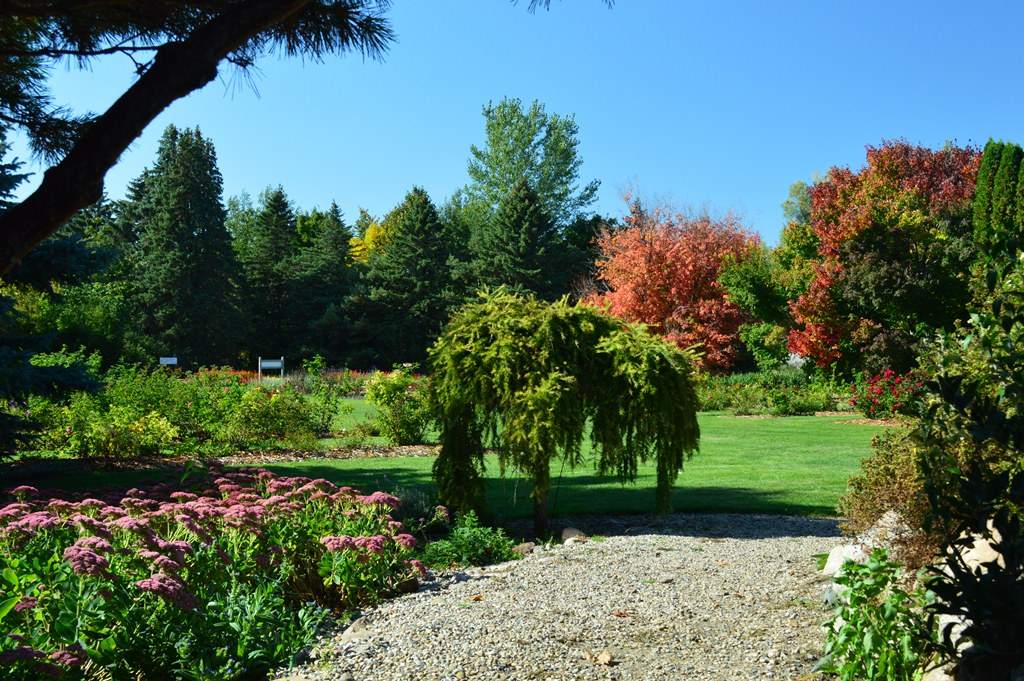
- View from the Rock Garden in early fall.
- Interactive map of McCrory Gardens and South Dakota Arboretum
- Type: Botanical gardens, Arboretum
- Location: Brookings, South Dakota
- Area: 70 acres (28 ha)
- Owner: South Dakota State University
- Website: www.sdstate.edu/mccrory-gardens

McCrory Gardens and South Dakota State Arboretum 70 acres (28 ha) are botanical gardens and an arboretum located on the South Dakota State University campus in Brookings, South Dakota.

McCrory Gardens is operated and maintained by South Dakota State University and named in honor of Professor S. A. McCrory, head of SDSU's horticulture department from 1947 until his death in 1964.

McCrory Gardens has over 25 acres of formal display gardens and 45 acres of arboretum featuring hundreds of different flowers, trees, shrubs and grasses in harmonious settings to display, educate, and further the development of new varieties.

The South Dakota State Arboretum features trees and shrubs that are adapted to South Dakota's climate. In addition new selections of trees and shrubs are trialed to test their adaptability to local growing conditions.

The gardens are funded primarily by donations, memberships, admission fees, special gifts, and endowment returns. Ongoing research continues to provide new information to the scientific community and the public on the introduction, cultivation, and arrangement of native and domesticated plants. The testing and evaluation of new woody plant selections and varieties in the climate of the northern Great Plains, initiated by Niels Ebbesen Hansen almost three-quarters of a century ago, remains an integral part of research.

== See also ==
- List of botanical gardens in the United States
