= Herman H. Natwick =

American politician

Herman H. Natwick (September 15, 1859 – February 15, 1914) was an American attorney and banker. He was member of the legislature of Dakota Territory (1885–1886).

== Biography ==
Natwick was born in Madison, Wisconsin. He studied law and was admitted to the bar in 1878. He moved to Brookings, South Dakota in 1880, where he practiced law until 1890. He was mayor of Brookings from 1886 to 1888. Natwick was a member of the Dakota Territorial Council from 1885 to 1886. Natwick moved from Brookings to Chamberlain, South Dakota in 1890, where he worked as the register of the land office. He moved to Sioux Falls, South Dakota in 1894. In 1900 he was one of the founders of the Central Banking and Trust Company and served as bank president.

== Personal life ==
He and his wife, Elizabeth (Haskell) Natwick, had one daughter, Mabel Natwick (1884–1900). Natwick died in Sioux Falls and was interred at Mt. Pleasant Cemetery, Sioux Falls, South Dakota.
