= Sioux Valley School District (South Dakota) =

School district in South Dakota, United States

Address
- 200 Hansina Ave Volga, South Dakota, 57071; United States

District information
- Grades: K - 12
- Superintendent: Laura K. Schuster
- NCES District ID: 4666300

Students and staff
- Enrollment: 700
- Student–teacher ratio: 14.92

Other information
- Telephone: (605) 627-5657
- Website: www.svs.k12.sd.us

The Sioux Valley School District 05-5 is a public school district in Brookings County, based in Volga, South Dakota.

The majority of the district is in Brookings County. There the district includes Volga, Bruce, Sinai, and a very small portion of Brookings. A small section of the district extends into Lake County.

== Schools ==
The Sioux Valley School District has one elementary school, one middle school, and one high school.

Schools:

- Sioux Valley Elementary School
- Sioux Valley Middle School
- Sioux Valley High School
