= Jennifer Trask =

American artist

- Born: 1970 (age 55–56); Cape Cod, Massachusetts
- Education: BFA Massachusetts College of Art, MFA State University of New York at New Paltz
- Occupation: Artist

Jennifer Trask (born 1970, Cape Cod, Massachusetts) is an American artist. She received a BFA in Metalsmithing from the Massachusetts College of Art, and an MFA from the State University of New York at New Paltz.

Her work is made from natural materials such as animal bones, antlers, and insect wings. She uses bone to help convey feelings of life and death, experiences, and environment.

She is known for her wearable jewelry that is reminiscent of Art Nouveau/Rococo styles.

Her work has been displayed at the Renwick Gallery at the Smithsonian American Art Museum, Museum of Arts and Design, The Museum of Fine Arts, Houston, Lisa Sette Gallery, and Gallery Loupe.
