= KJJQ =

Radio station in Volga, South Dakota

- Volga, South Dakota; United States
- Broadcast area: Brookings, South Dakota
- Frequency: 910 kHz
- Branding: The Ranch AM 910

Programming
- Format: Classic country, farm
- Affiliations: Brownfield Network

Ownership
- Owner: Connoisseur Media; (Alpha 3E License, LLC)
- Sister stations: KBRK (AM); KBRK-FM; KDBX; KKQQ

History
- First air date: 1981
- Former call signs: KVAA (1979–1985)

Technical information
- Licensing authority: FCC
- Facility ID: 9677
- Class: B
- Power: 500 watts
- Transmitter coordinates: 44°15′0.9″N 96°57′23.2″W

Links
- Public license information: Public file; LMS
- Webcast: Listen live
- Website: www.brookingsradio.com/stations/the-ranch-am-910/

KJJQ (910 AM; "The Ranch") is a radio station in Volga, South Dakota, broadcasting a classic country and farm format. The station's transmitter is located in Volga, but the studios are in the nearby city of Brookings. Known as The Ranch AM 910, the station has a broad range transmitting across eastern South Dakota and western Minnesota, reaching the cities of Yankton, South Dakota, Webster, South Dakota, Chamberlain, South Dakota, Marshall, Minnesota, Olivia, Minnesota, and the communities between these points. The station was formerly in a historic train depot and went by the name Depot Radio. In 2005, the depot was sold and KJJQ relocated to the building now housing the other four commercial radio stations in Brookings.
