= KDBX =

Radio station in Clear Lake, South Dakota

- Clear Lake, South Dakota; United States
- Broadcast area: Brookings, South Dakota
- Frequency: 107.1 MHz
- Branding: 107.1 The Hawk

Programming
- Format: Classic rock
- Affiliations: The Bob & Tom Show

Ownership
- Owner: Connoisseur Media; (Alpha 3E License, LLC)
- Sister stations: KBRK (AM); KBRK-FM; KJJQ; KKQQ

History
- First air date: 1999
- Former call signs: KBGV (1998–1999, CP)

Technical information
- Facility ID: 87411
- Class: C3
- ERP: 9,900 watts
- HAAT: 158 meters (518 ft)
- Transmitter coordinates: 44°35′36.9″N 96°39′51.2″W

Links
- Webcast: Listen live
- Website: www.brookingsradio.com/stations/the-hawk-107-1/

KDBX (107.1 MHz) is a radio station whose transmitter is located in the nearby town of Clear Lake, South Dakota, but the studios are in Brookings. The station carries The Bob & Tom Show in the mornings, and is an affiliate of the syndicated Floydian Slip Pink Floyd show. KDBX broadcasts across a wide region encompassing both the Brookings and Watertown areas in eastern South Dakota as well as reaching points in western Minnesota as far as Marshall and Benson. The station was formerly in a historic train depot. In 2005, the depot was sold and KDBX relocated to the building now housing the other four commercial radio stations in Brookings.

== Format ==
KDBX is a classic rock station playing a mix of rock music from the 1960s through the 1980s. The station changed to this format in the summer of 2005, switching from an alternative music format.
