= Lloyd E. Herman =

American museum planner and curator

Lloyd Eldred Herman
- Born: March 19, 1936; United States
- Died: January 2, 2023 (aged 86)
- Education: Oregon State University, American University
- Occupations: Arts administrator, curator, museum planner, writer
- Organization: Renwick Gallery
- Movement: contemporary craft movement

Lloyd Eldred Herman (March 19, 1936 – January 2, 2023) was an American arts administrator, curator, writer, museum planner and acknowledged expert on contemporary craft. He was known for being the founding Director of the Renwick Gallery of the Smithsonian American Art Museum in Washington D.C., from 1971 to 1986.

Herman was elected as an honorary fellow by the American Craft Council in 1988. Additionally he was an Honorary Lifetime Member of Northwest Designer Craftsmen, a member of the American Alliance of Museums, an honorary member of the American Society of Interior Designers, and a trustee of the Highline Historical Society. He was decorated in Belgium and Denmark for exhibitions that he organized in their countries. Herman died on January 2, 2023, at the age of 86.

== Early life and education ==
Herman was an Oregon native. He attended elementary and high school near Corvallis.

After high school graduation in 1954, he enrolled at Oregon State College (now Oregon State University) in Corvallis, with the hopes of becoming an actor, or a teacher. His education was interrupted by two years active duty in the United States Navy. On his return to Oregon, he enrolled as a junior at the University of Oregon in Eugene, majoring in speech and drama. He went to Washington D.C. to enroll in the acting program at Catholic University of America for his senior year. He was not accepted, instead enrolling at the American University, where he graduated with a BS degree in 1960.

== Career ==
=== Smithsonian Institution ===
Herman joined the staff of the Smithsonian Institution in 1966 as Administrative Officer to the Director of the National Museum, and began to develop a changing exhibition program for the galleries of the Arts and Industries Building. As the Director of what was intended to become the Smithsonian Exhibition Hall, he began booking traveling exhibitions from museums and traveling exhibition services. That experience led him to propose a similar temporary exhibition program for the former Federal Court of Claims building, designed in 1859 by architect James Renwick as the Corcoran Gallery of Art that had been transferred to the Smithsonian. In 1968, Lloyd Herman developed a proposal for the “Renwick Design Centre” as a changing exhibition program for such exhibitions from various sources, to be administered as a component of the Exposition Hall programs. In 1970, he was hired to implement it as Administrator, Renwick Gallery. He developed temporary exhibitions that would reflect the range that the Renwick Gallery planned to embrace: architecture and design, contemporary and traditional craft, traditional decorative arts, plus ethnic and folk art from various countries. He subsequently became the first Director of the Renwick Gallery, and from 1972 to 1986 presented over 100 exhibitions. Lloyd Herman retired from the Smithsonian Institution in 1986.

=== Museum planning ===
In 1988, Herman began the directorship of the Cartright Gallery, a non-profit craft gallery in Vancouver, B.C., and planned its future as the Canadian Craft Museum. Working there for three years, he developed a space-use plan and an exhibition program.

At the same time, he curated traveling shows for the Whatcom Museum of History and Art in Bellingham, WA. They included Into the Woods: Washington Wood Artists, Clearly Art: Pilchuck's Glass Legacy, and Trashformations: Recycled Materials in Contemporary American Art and Design, among others.

In 1993 he was hired by Oregon State University to plan a new museum on the Oregon Coast as part of the Thundering Seas Institute, a craft school component of the university's art department. Though advanced architectural planning and land acquisition at Agate Beach in Newport, OR, proceeded, the facility was never built.

He joined the planning staff for the Museum of Glass in Tacoma, Washington in 1998 as Acting Senior Curator, writing collection and exhibition policies, and advising on space planning for the facility prior to its construction.

=== Independent curator and lecturer ===
Herman continued to curate exhibitions on craft and design topics for the United States Information Agency, the Smithsonian Institution Traveling Exhibition Service, and various other museums and traveling exhibition services. He lectured on American crafts throughout the United States, and numerous locations abroad. He led craft tours to Bhutan, India, Iran, Jordan, Morocco, and Vietnam. He lectured regularly on contemporary glass art for Elderhostel/Road Scholar programs in Seattle.

== Publications ==
Herman co-authored the book, Thomas Mann, Metal Artist. Later writing projects included books on glass artists Narcissus Quagliata and Josh Simpson.

- Herman, Lloyd E. (1998). Trashformations: Recycled Materials in Contemporary American Art and Design (art exhibition). Whatcom Museum of History and Art. Whatcom Museum of History and Art. ISBN 9780295977201.
- Herman, Lloyd E. (1998). American Glass: Masters of the Art. Smithsonian Institution Traveling Exhibition Service. ISBN 9780295977560.
- Herman, Lloyd E. (1992). Clearly Art, Pilchuck's Glass Legacy (art exhibition). Whatcom Museum of History and Art. Whatcom Museum of History and Art. ISBN 9780938506003.
- Herman, Lloyd E. (1990). Art That Works: The Decorative Arts of the Eighties, Crafted in America. Mint Museum. University of Washington Press. ISBN 9780295970073.
