= Piers Hemmingsen =

Canadian music historian

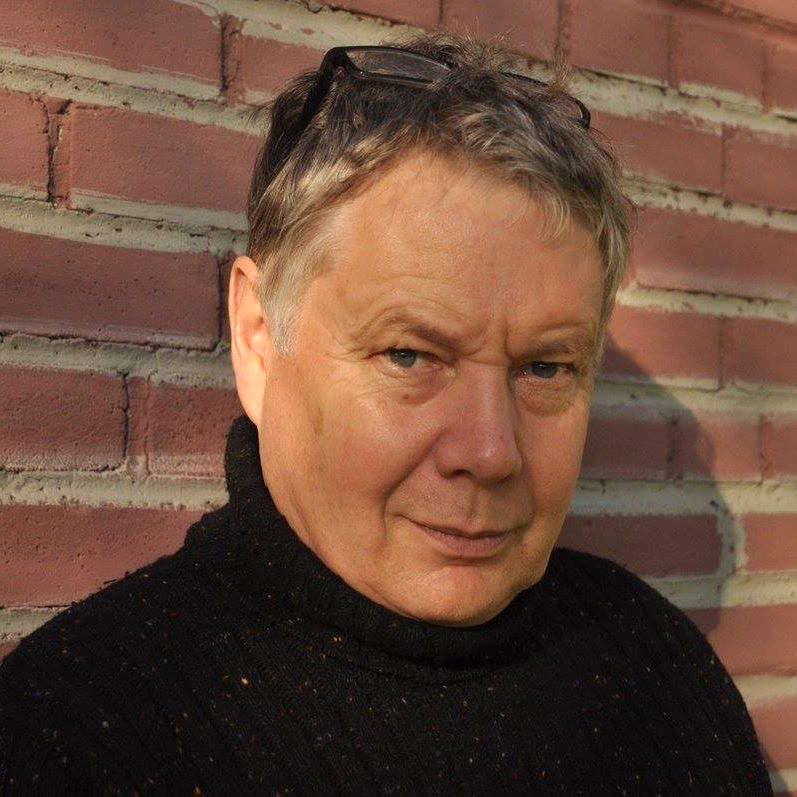
- Born: 1955 (age 70–71); Salisbury, England
- Occupation: music historian
- Writing career
- Subject: The Beatles
- Notable works: The Beatles in Canada: The Origins of Beatlemania! and The Beatles in Canada: The Evolution 1964-1970

Piers Hemmingsen (born 1955) is Canada's leading Beatles expert, specializing in all aspects of the Beatles having to do with Canada. His 476-page book, The Beatles in Canada: The Origins of Beatlemania!, was published in 2016. A follow-up book, The Beatles in Canada: The Evolution 1964-1970, was published in 2025. He has written articles, given lectures, conducted tours, and curated museum exhibits on the subject of the Beatles in Canada.

== Biography ==
Hemmingsen was born in 1955 in Salisbury, Wiltshire in England. His early exposure to the Beatles was through his older brother's vinyl records, and seeing them perform "Please Please Me" on 19 January 1963 on the television show Thank Your Lucky Stars. Hemmingsen's family moved to Canada in August 1963.

Hemmingsen obtained degrees from Carleton University in Ottawa and the University of Toronto. He originally worked as a computer programmer, starting in the 1970s. He coded the first Canadian computerized passport printing system in 1977.

Having established himself as a Beatles expert, he conducted archival research for EMI Canada in the 1990s, as well as for Universal Music Canada.

== The Beatles in Canada ==
There are two volumes in The Beatles in Canada series of books. Published in 2016, The Beatles in Canada: The Origins of Beatlemania! examines in 476 pages the years 1963 and 1964. The book documents how Beatlemania took root in Canada before the United States, and has forewords by Beatles historian Mark Lewisohn and former Capitol Records of Canada executive Paul White. The latter provided Hemmingsen with information for the book, as did Beatle relatives, record pressing plant workers, radio station employees and others over the course of five years of research.

While researching the book Hemmingsen learned of an 8 mm silent movie which captured the pandemonium taking place at Toronto's Maple Leaf Gardens on 7 September 1964, when the Beatles played two concerts there. It was filmed by former Toronto Argonauts football player Don McKenzie, who worked at the Gardens. In 2010 Hemmingsen bought the film from McKenzie's son, who included two reels of soundboard audio recordings that had been initiated by his father in 1965. They contained the Beatles' afternoon performance of 17 August 1965, as well as the opening acts and press conference.

The second volume in the series, The Beatles in Canada: The Evolution 1964-1970, was published in 2025.

== Other work ==
Hemmingsen has compiled and published a discography of the Beatles' Canadian releases, and has contributed chapters to many of Bruce Spizer's books on the Beatles. He has written articles for British Beatles Fan Club Magazine, Goldmine magazine, and Record Collector magazine.

In 2016 he co-curated When the Beatles Rocked Toronto, an exhibit at the St. Lawrence Market Gallery in Toronto Ontario.

In 2024 he curated From Me to You: The Beatles in Canada 1964-1966, an exhibit that ran for almost a year at the National Music Centre in Calgary Alberta.

Hemmingsen has lectured on the Beatles and has conducted walking tours in Toronto.

In 2026, the Art Gallery of Ontario (AGO) presented Paul McCartney Photographs 1963-64: Eyes of the Storm, and Hemmingsen, described by the AGO as Canada's leading Beatles expert, provided material from his collection of Beatles ephemera for an adjacent installation, Beatlemania! in Toronto. This display underscored Toronto's position at the vanguard of Beatlemania in North America.

== Books by Piers Hemmingsen on the Beatles ==
The Beatles Canadian Discography, 1962-1970 (1999)

The Beatles in Canada: The Origins of Beatlemania! (2016)

The Beatles in Canada: The Evolution 1964-1970 (2025)

Compilations by Bruce Spizer with Canadian chapter by Piers Hemmingsen:

The Beatles and Sgt. Pepper: A Fan's Perspective (2017)

The Beatles White Album and the Launch of Apple (2018)

The Beatles Get Back to Abbey Road (2019)

The Beatles Finally Let It Be (2020)

The Beatles Magical Mystery Tour and Yellow Submarine (2021)

The Beatles Rubber Soul To Revolver (2022)

The Beatles Please Please Me to With The Beatles (2023)

The Beatles A Hard Day's Night and More (2024)

Beatles For Sale to Help! (2025)
