= Steve Hemmingsen =

American journalist

Steve Hemmingsen is an American retired news anchor and reporter for KELO-TV in Sioux Falls, South Dakota.

Hemmingsen began at KELO-TV in 1969. From 1977 to 2002, he co-anchored the 6 p.m. newscast with Doug Lund. He then served as co-anchor with Angela Kennecke. In May 2000, he entered retirement.

Hemmingsen currently writes the "Weighing In" column at the Keloland.com website. He resides in Florida.
