= Patrick Dougherty (artist) =

American artist

- Born: 1945 (age 80–81); Oklahoma City, Oklahoma, USA
- Education: University of North Carolina at Chapel Hill (B.A.); University of Iowa (M.A.)
- Movement: Environmental art

Patrick Dougherty (born 1945) is an American environmental artist. He is best known for his sculptures and installations built with sticks and saplings.

== Life and career ==
Patrick Dougherty was born in Oklahoma in 1945 and raised in North Carolina. He earned a B.A. in English at the University of North Carolina at Chapel Hill in 1967 and an M.A. in Hospital and Health Administration from the University of Iowa in 1969. He later returned to the University of North Carolina to study art history and sculpture.

Dougherty's first work, “Maple Body Wrap,” was included in the North Carolina Biennial Artists’ Exhibition in 1982. Since that time he has constructed over 300 works using stick and saplings. His sculptures are temporary in that the materials disintegrate and break down over time.

Over the years, Dougherty has received a number of awards and grants, including the 2011 Factor Prize for Southern Art from the Gibbes Museum of Art, Pollock-Krasner Foundation Grant, Henry Moore Foundation Fellowship from England, Japan-US Creative Arts Fellowship, and National Endowment for the Arts Fellowship.

Dougherty also published a book about his art, Stickwork, through Princeton Architectural Press in 2009.

Directors Kenny Dalsheimer and Penelope Maunsell created a documentary about Dougherty and his sculptures, Bending Sticks: The Sculpture of Patrick Dougherty, which was released in 2013. The film was featured at the Environmental Film Festival in the Nation's Capital in 2013 due to the environmental nature of Doughtery's work.

Dougherty currently lives in Chapel Hill with his wife Linda Dougherty, who is the chief curator at the North Carolina Museum of Art.

== Gallery ==
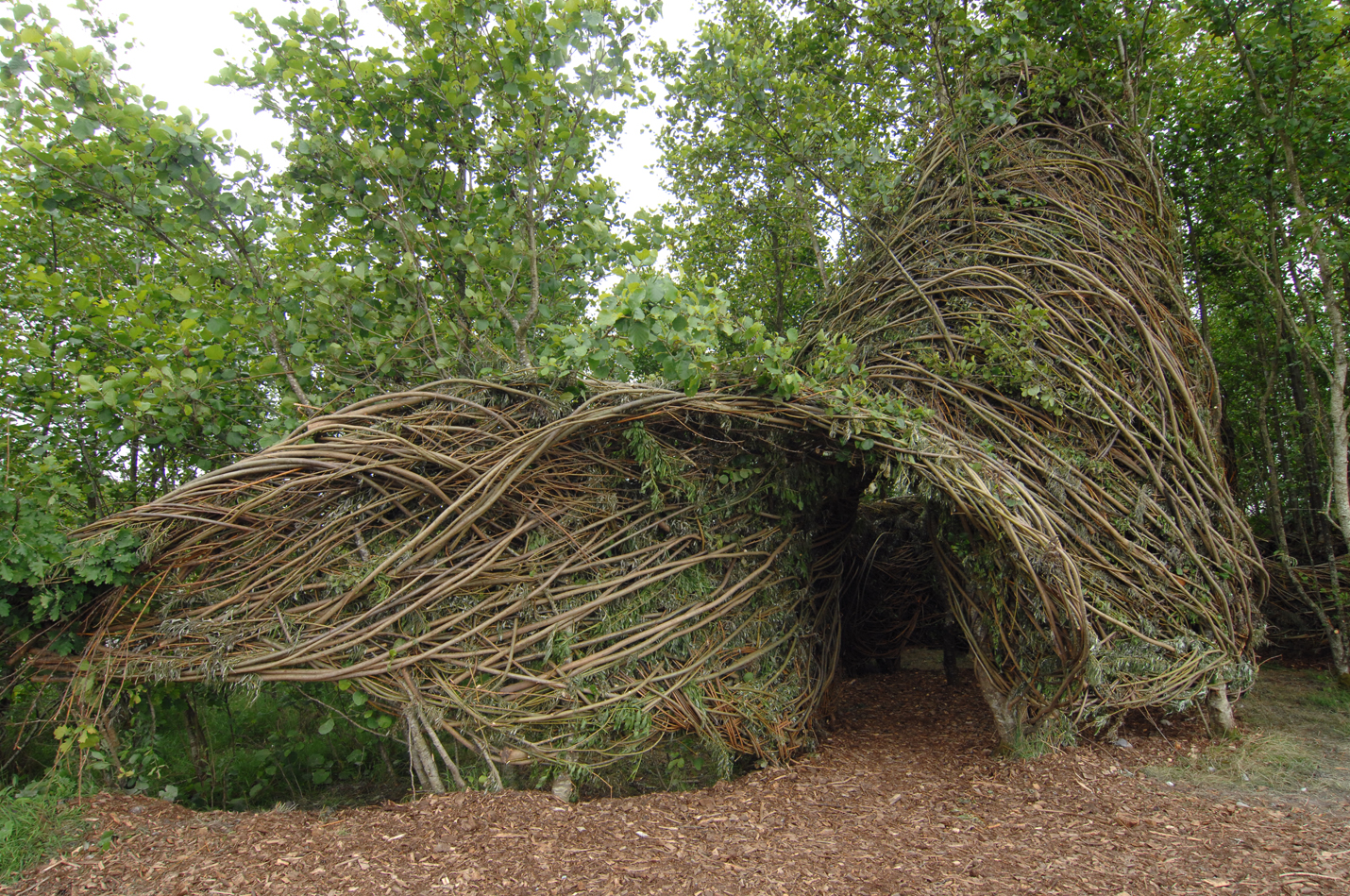
Ruaille Buaille (2008), Sculpture in the Parklands, Ireland

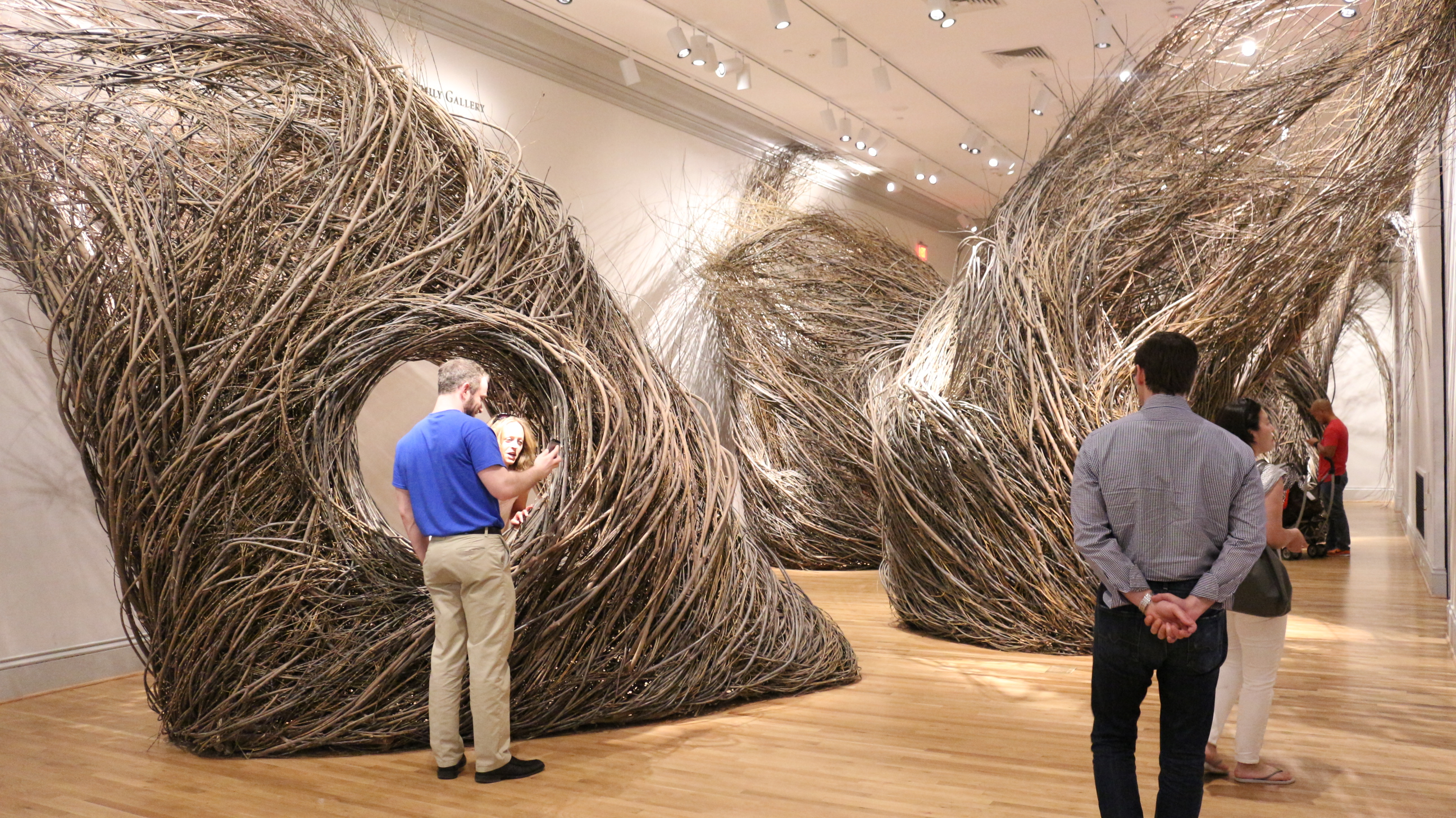
Shindig (2015), Renwick Gallery, Smithsonian American Art Museum

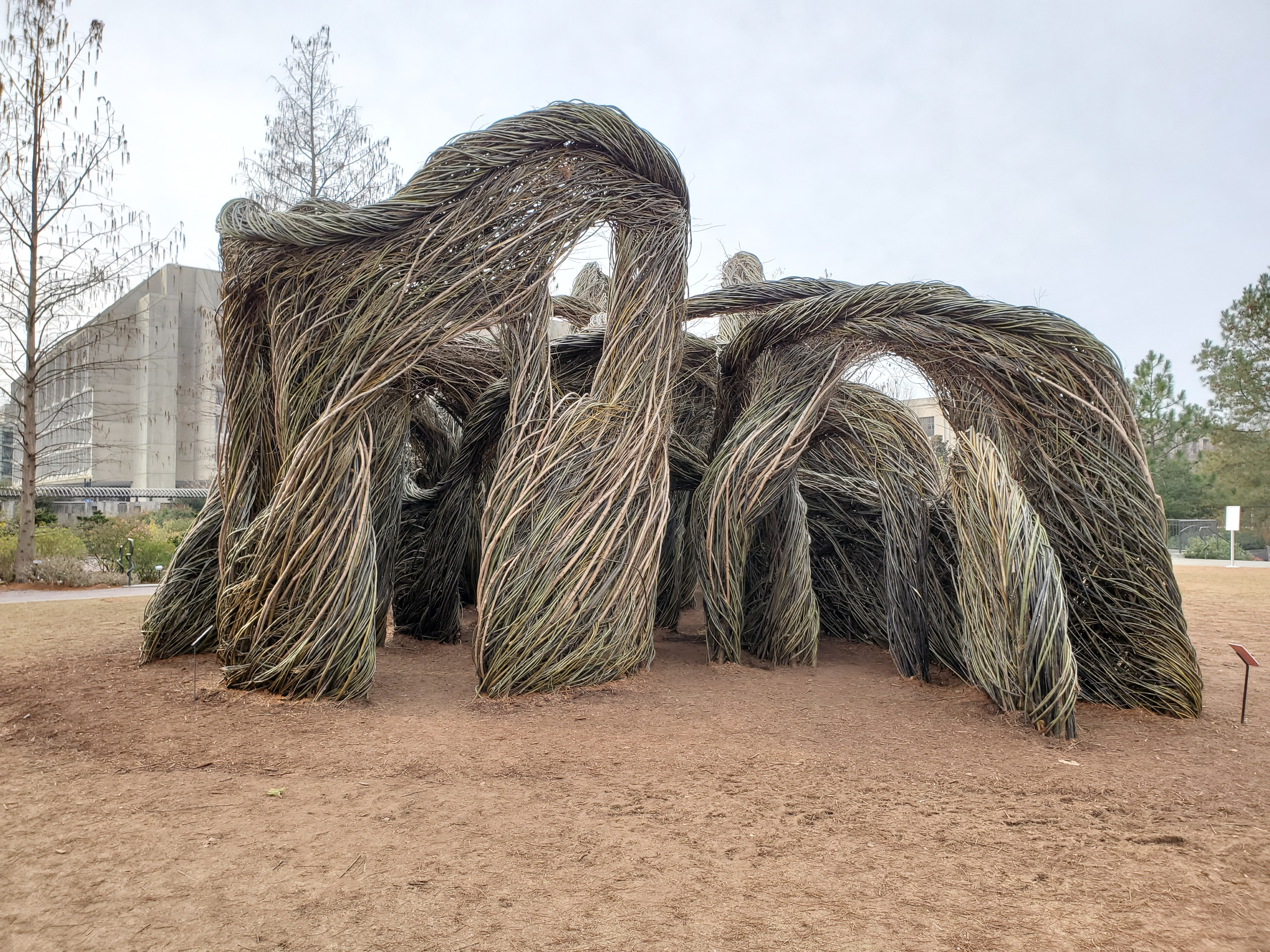
O Say Can You See (2019), United States Botanic Garden
