= Brookings, South Dakota =

- City
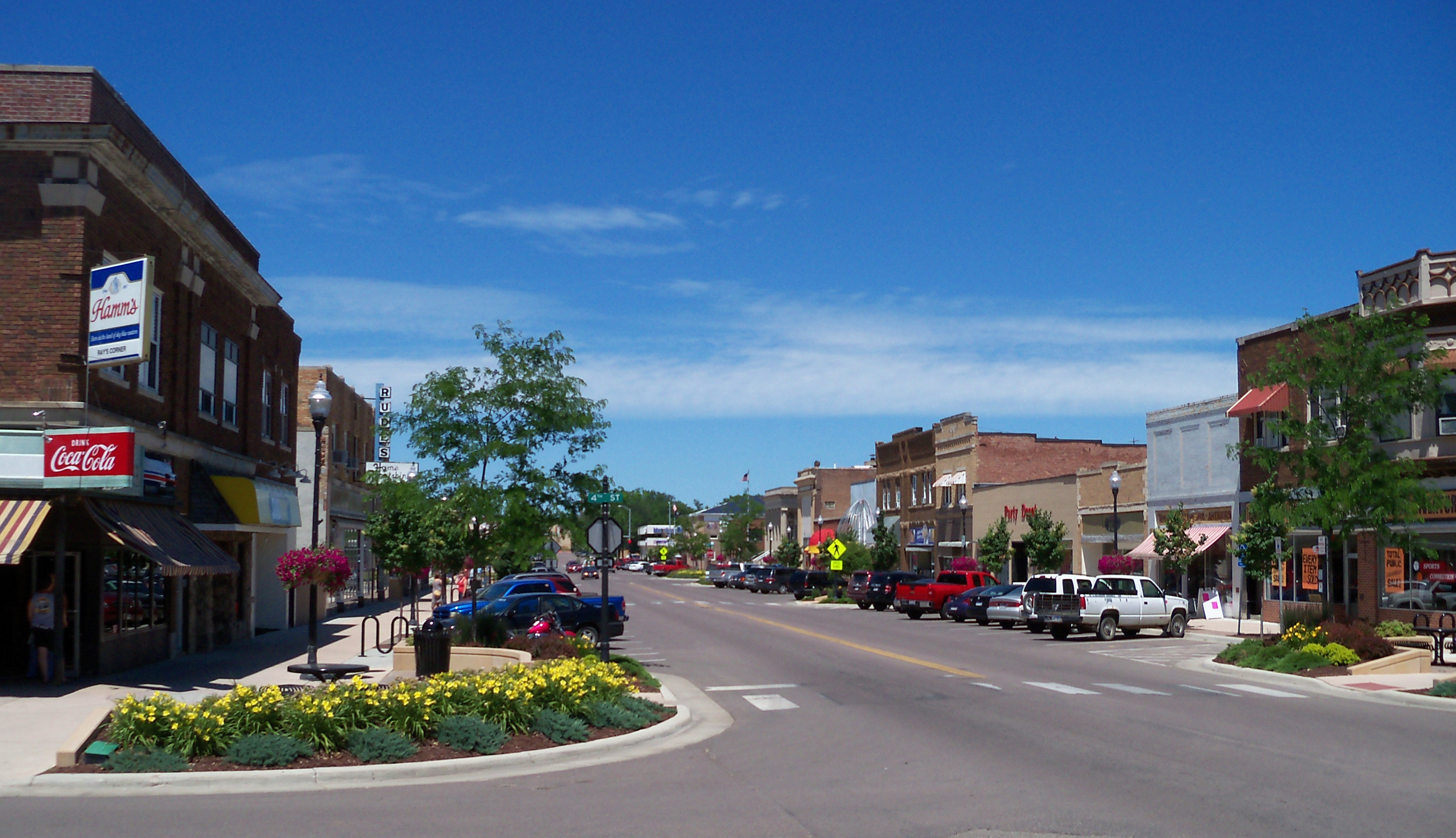
- Main Avenue in downtown Brookings
- Nickname: Scoreboard Town
- Location of Brookings, South Dakota
- Coordinates: 44°18′7.74″N 96°47′10.72″W
- Country: United States
- State: South Dakota
- County: Brookings
- Founded: 1879
- Incorporated: March 9, 1883

Government
  - Mayor: Oepke "Ope" Niemeyer
  - City manager: Paul M. Briseno

Area
  - City: 14.035 sq mi (36.350 km^{2})
  - Land: 13.956 sq mi (36.146 km^{2})
  - Water: 0.079 sq mi (0.205 km^{2})
- Elevation: 1,660 ft (506 m)

Population (2020)
  - City: 23,377
  - Estimate (2023): 24,312
  - Density: 1,742.1/sq mi (672.61/km^{2})
  - Urban: 23,674
  - Metro: 35,980
- Time zone: UTC−6 (Central (CST))
  - Summer (DST): UTC−5 (CDT)
- ZIP Codes: 57006, 57007
- Area code: 605
- FIPS code: 46-07580
- GNIS feature ID: 1267299
- Sales tax: 6.2%
- Website: cityofbrookings-sd.gov

Brookings is a city in and the county seat of Brookings County, South Dakota, United States. It is located 60 miles (97 km) north of the state’s largest city, Sioux Falls. The population was 23,377 at the 2020 census, making it the fourth most populous city in South Dakota, and was estimated to be 24,312 in 2023. It is home to South Dakota State University, the state's largest institution of higher education. Also in Brookings are the South Dakota Art Museum, the Children's Museum of South Dakota, the annual Brookings Summer Arts Festival, and the headquarters of several manufacturing companies and agricultural operations.

== History ==
=== Pioneer ===
The county and city were both named after one of South Dakota's pioneer promoters, Wilmot Brookings. Brookings set out for the Dakota Territory in June 1857. He arrived at Sioux Falls on August 27, 1857, and became one of the first settlers there. He and his group represented the Western Town Company. After a time in Sioux Falls, Brookings and a companion set out for the Yankton area to locate a town in an area that was soon to be ceded by the Native Americans. This trip began in January 1858, and the two soon encountered a blizzard that froze Brookings's feet, which both had to be amputated.

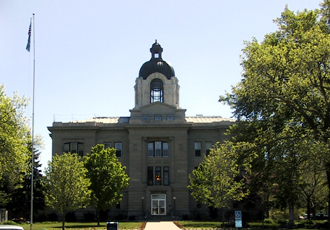
Brookings County Courthouse

Brookings rose to a high position in the Territory, becoming a member of the Squatter Territorial Legislature and later elected Squatter Governor. He then was appointed superintendent of a road that was to be built from the Minnesota state line west to the Missouri River about 30 miles north of Ft. Pierre. It was during this road's construction that Brookings came into contact with land that was part of this county at the time. He made settlement of this area possible for many people.

=== Medary ===
The first real town organized in Brookings County was Medary, in 1857. Before that, the area had been traveled and utilized only by Native Americans, with a few indistinct traces left showing the penetration of the area by explorers, missionaries, trappers, and traders. Along with Sioux Falls and Flandreau, Medary was one of the first three European settlements established in South Dakota.

The first site of Medary was located by the Dakota Land Company of Minnesota, led by Alpheus G. Fuller and Franklin J. DeWitt and accompanied by engineer Samuel A. Medary, Jr. In 1857, the men put up quarters in preparation to live out the winter in Medary. Many other settlers moved into the area in 1858. But in the spring of that year, a large group of Yankton and Yanktonnia Indians drove the settlers from the area, and Medary remained nearly abandoned for the next 11 years.

In 1869, a group of 10 Norwegian pioneers moved west into the Dakota Territory and resettled the area of Medary, about four and a half miles south of present-day Brookings. The county of Brookings was formally organized in Medary in Martin Trygstad's cabin on July 3, 1871. The county's original boundaries extended to two miles south of Flandreau. The territorial legislature established the current boundaries on January 8, 1873. Two other small settlements, Oakwood and Fountain, appeared in the Brookings County area around this time. All three hoped to be the town the railroad would decide to run through as it moved westward. The railroad bypassed Medary, so it became a ghost town.

=== Railroad ===
In fact, the railroad bypassed all three towns. When the businessmen of Medary and Fountain found out that the railroad had no plans to run through the two towns, they began a push to find a central location. Many private meetings and much effort on the part of the men of Medary and Fountain led the railroad to lay its tracks through what became the city of Brookings.

In a letter sent to Chicago on September 30, 1879, Land Commissioner Charles E. Simmons communicated the layout of the series of towns in Brookings County for the railroad to pass through: Aurora, Brookings, and Volga. Many merchants of Medary and Fountain packed up their businesses and belongings and moved to Brookings, which was surveyed and platted on October 3 and 4, 1879. Fountain ceased to exist; Medary and Oakwood remained for a while but eventually faded away. A monument still stands at the site of the old Medary as a reminder of the people who once lived there.

The railroad crossed the Minnesota state line into Brookings County on October 2, 1879. With tracks being built at about one mile per day, the track and first train reached Brookings's Main Street on October 18, 1879. The railroad station opened a month later.

Brookings was laid out in 1880.

== Geography ==
Brookings is located at 44°18′7.74″N 96°47′10.72″W (44.3021491, -96.7863120).

According to the United States Census Bureau, the city has an area of 14.035 square miles (36.35 km^{2}), of which 13.956 square miles (36.15 km^{2}) is land and 0.079 square miles (0.20 km^{2}), is water.

=== Climate ===
Brookings experiences a humid continental climate (Köppen Dfb), which is characterized by warm, relatively humid summers and cold, dry winters, and is in USDA Hardiness Zones 4. The monthly daily average temperature range from 12.8 °F (−10.7 °C) in January to 70.7 °F (21.5 °C) in July, while there are 8 days of 90 °F (32 °C)+ highs and 35 days with sub-0 °F (−18 °C) lows annually. Snowfall occurs mostly in light to moderate amounts, totaling 35.8 inches (91 cm). Precipitation, at 25.21 inches (640 mm) annually, is concentrated in the warmer months. Extremes range from −41 °F (−41 °C) as recently as January 12, 1912 to 109 °F (43 °C) on July 24, 1940.

Climate data for Brookings, South Dakota (1991−2020 normals, extremes 1893−present)
Month	Jan	Feb	Mar	Apr	May	Jun	Jul	Aug	Sep	Oct	Nov	Dec	Year
Record high °F (°C)	65 (18)	69 (21)	85 (29)	93 (34)	106 (41)	105 (41)	109 (43)	106 (41)	102 (39)	93 (34)	79 (26)	68 (20)	109 (43)
Mean maximum °F (°C)	43.2 (6.2)	48.8 (9.3)	65.1 (18.4)	78.9 (26.1)	86.7 (30.4)	90.8 (32.7)	92.4 (33.6)	91.3 (32.9)	87.2 (30.7)	80.7 (27.1)	63.6 (17.6)	47.1 (8.4)	94.5 (34.7)
Mean daily maximum °F (°C)	22.2 (−5.4)	26.9 (−2.8)	39.1 (3.9)	54.1 (12.3)	66.8 (19.3)	76.8 (24.9)	81.4 (27.4)	79.3 (26.3)	72.0 (22.2)	57.6 (14.2)	41.0 (5.0)	27.5 (−2.5)	53.7 (12.1)
Daily mean °F (°C)	12.8 (−10.7)	17.1 (−8.3)	29.5 (−1.4)	43.1 (6.2)	56.0 (13.3)	66.6 (19.2)	70.7 (21.5)	68.4 (20.2)	60.1 (15.6)	45.9 (7.7)	31.2 (−0.4)	18.6 (−7.4)	43.3 (6.3)
Mean daily minimum °F (°C)	3.5 (−15.8)	7.4 (−13.7)	19.9 (−6.7)	32.1 (0.1)	45.2 (7.3)	56.3 (13.5)	60.1 (15.6)	57.4 (14.1)	48.2 (9.0)	34.2 (1.2)	21.5 (−5.8)	9.7 (−12.4)	33.0 (0.6)
Mean minimum °F (°C)	−19.9 (−28.8)	−14.7 (−25.9)	−5.4 (−20.8)	16.8 (−8.4)	29.9 (−1.2)	42.8 (6.0)	46.7 (8.2)	44.1 (6.7)	31.1 (−0.5)	18.0 (−7.8)	2.1 (−16.6)	−13.2 (−25.1)	−23.5 (−30.8)
Record low °F (°C)	−41 (−41)	−41 (−41)	−23 (−31)	−2 (−19)	17 (−8)	28 (−2)	37 (3)	28 (−2)	12 (−11)	−9 (−23)	−22 (−30)	−36 (−38)	−41 (−41)
Average precipitation inches (mm)	0.43 (11)	0.50 (13)	1.06 (27)	2.17 (55)	3.45 (88)	4.29 (109)	3.61 (92)	3.22 (82)	3.10 (79)	1.97 (50)	0.80 (20)	0.61 (15)	25.21 (640)
Average snowfall inches (cm)	5.5 (14)	7.1 (18)	6.4 (16)	4.1 (10)	0.1 (0.25)	0.0 (0.0)	0.0 (0.0)	0.0 (0.0)	0.0 (0.0)	1.1 (2.8)	4.7 (12)	6.8 (17)	35.8 (91)
Average precipitation days (≥ 0.01 in)	6.0	5.6	6.8	9.6	12.5	12.0	10.0	9.1	8.4	7.7	4.9	6.0	98.6
Average snowy days (≥ 0.1 in)	6.2	5.2	4.3	2.0	0.0	0.0	0.0	0.0	0.0	0.7	2.9	5.9	27.2
Source: NOAA

== Demographics ==
Historical population
Census	Pop.	Note	%±
1890	1,518		—
1900	2,846		87.5%
1910	2,971		4.4%
1920	3,921		32.0%
1930	4,376		11.6%
1940	5,346		22.2%
1950	7,764		45.2%
1960	10,558		36.0%
1970	13,717		29.9%
1980	14,951		9.0%
1990	16,270		8.8%
2000	18,504		13.7%
2010	22,056		19.2%
2020	23,377		6.0%
2023 (est.)	24,312		4.0%
U.S. Decennial Census; 2020 Census

As of the 2023 American Community Survey, there are 8,860 estimated households in Brookings with an average of 2.31 persons per household. The city has a median household income of $61,979. Approximately 16.1% of the city's population lives at or below the poverty line. Brookings has an estimated 69.2% employment rate, with 49.7% of the population holding a bachelor's degree or higher and 96.7% holding a high school diploma.

The top five reported ancestries (people were allowed to report up to two ancestries, thus the figures will generally add to more than 100%) were English (90.4%), Spanish (2.9%), Indo-European (3.8%), Asian and Pacific Islander (1.3%), and Other (1.5%).

=== Racial and ethnic composition ===
Brookings, South Dakota – racial and ethnic composition Note: the US Census treats Hispanic/Latino as an ethnic category. This table excludes Latinos from the racial categories and assigns them to a separate category. Hispanics/Latinos may be of any race.
Race / ethnicity (NH = non-Hispanic)	Pop. 2000	Pop. 2010	Pop. 2020	% 2000	% 2010	% 2020
White alone (NH)	17,598	20,123	19,824	95.10%	91.24%	84.80%
Black or African American alone (NH)	79	232	565	0.43%	1.05%	2.42%
Native American or Alaska Native alone (NH)	177	208	293	0.96%	0.94%	1.25%
Asian alone (NH)	347	818	878	1.88%	3.71%	3.76%
Pacific Islander alone (NH)	9	8	12	0.05%	0.04%	0.05%
Other race alone (NH)	14	12	38	0.08%	0.05%	0.16%
Mixed race or multiracial (NH)	141	320	797	0.76%	1.45%	3.41%
Hispanic or Latino (any race)	139	335	970	0.75%	1.52%	4.15%
Total	18,504	22,056	23,377	100.00%	100.00%	100.00%

=== 2020 census ===
As of the 2020 census, Brookings had a population of 23,377 people in 8,861 households, including 4,405 families. The median age was 26.3 years. 18.5% of residents were under the age of 18 and 11.9% of residents were 65 years of age or older. For every 100 females there were 102.9 males, and for every 100 females age 18 and over there were 102.9 males age 18 and over.

The population density was 1,736.6 inhabitants per square mile (670.5/km^{2}). There were 10,031 housing units at an average density of 745.2 per square mile (287.7/km^{2}). 99.0% of residents lived in urban areas, while 1.0% lived in rural areas.

There were 8,861 households, of which 24.9% had children under the age of 18 living in them. Of all households, 38.6% were married-couple households, 27.0% were households with a male householder and no spouse or partner present, and 27.9% were households with a female householder and no spouse or partner present. About 35.6% of all households were made up of individuals and 9.7% had someone living alone who was 65 years of age or older.

Of the 10,031 housing units, 11.7% were vacant. The homeowner vacancy rate was 1.6% and the rental vacancy rate was 14.5%.

=== 2010 census ===
As of the 2010 census, there were 22,056 people, 8,159 households, and 3,836 families residing in the city. The population density was 1,704.8 inhabitants per square mile (658.2/km^{2}). There were 8,715 housing units at an average density of 673.5 per square mile (260.0/km^{2}). The racial makeup of the city was 92.06% White, 1.06% African American, 0.98% Native American, 3.72% Asian, 0.04% Pacific Islander, 0.54% from some other races and 1.60% from two or more races. Hispanic or Latino people of any race were 1.52% of the population.

There were 8,159 households, of which 23.2% had children under the age of 18 living with them, 37.5% were married couples living together, 6.5% had a female householder with no husband present, 3.0% had a male householder with no wife present, and 53.0% were non-families. 32.6% of all households were made up of individuals, and 7.8% had someone living alone who was 65 years of age or older. The average household size was 2.29 and the average family size was 2.93.

The median age in the city was 23.5 years. 16.1% of residents were under the age of 18; 38% were between the ages of 18 and 24; 22.3% were from 25 to 44; 15.2% were from 45 to 64; and 8.4% were 65 years of age or older. The gender makeup of the city was 51.1% male and 48.9% female.

=== 2000 census ===
As of the 2000 census, there were 18,504 people, 6,971 households, and 3,422 families residing in the city. The population density was 1,549.7 inhabitants per square mile (598.3/km^{2}). There were 7,359 housing units at an average density of 616.3 per square mile (238.0/km^{2}). The racial makeup of the city was 95.49% White, 0.44% African American, 0.99% Native American, 1.88% Asian, 0.05% Pacific Islander, 0.26% from some other races and 0.88% from two or more races. Hispanic or Latino people of any race were 0.75% of the population.

There were 6,971 households, out of which 24.9% had children under the age of 18 living with them, 39.5% were married couples living together, 7.3% had a female householder with no husband present, and 50.9% were non-families. 34.4% of all households were made up of individuals, and 9.0% had someone living alone who was 65 years of age or older. The average household size was 2.26 and the average family size was 2.93.

In the city, the population was spread out, with 17.4% under the age of 18, 36.6% from 18 to 24, 22.0% from 25 to 44, 14.0% from 45 to 64, and 9.9% who were 65 years of age or older. The median age was 24 years. For every 100 females, there were 99.7 males. For every 100 females age 18 and over, there were 98.6 males.

As of 2000 the median income for a household in the city was $31,266, and the median income for a family was $49,246. Males had a median income of $31,276 versus $22,763 for females. The per capita income for the city was $17,028. About 7.3% of families and 18.5% of the population were below the poverty line, including 12.7% of those under age 18 and 6.6% of those age 65 or over.

=== Ancestry ===
The two largest ancestries in the city are:

- 44.5% German
- 24.8% Norwegian

=== Religion ===
As of 2010, 60.7% of Brookings's population claimed affiliation with a religious congregation. The largest such groups were:

- Lutheran – 29%
- Roman Catholic – 22%
- Methodist – 10%
- Wesleyan – 10%
- All other religious congregations – 30%

Brookings is also home to the Institute of Lutheran Theology, a pan-denominational Lutheran seminary. Students come from across the Lutheran spectrum, with the majority affiliated with one of three denominations: the North American Lutheran Church, Lutheran Congregations in Mission for Christ and the Canadian Association of Lutheran Congregations.

== Economy ==
=== Top employers ===
According to the city's 2023 Annual Comprehensive Financial Report, the largest employers in the city are:

#	Employer	# of Employees	Percentage
1	South Dakota State University	3,973	11.04%
2	Daktronics	1,329	3.69%
3	Solventum	1,156	3.21%
4	Walmart	538	1.50%
5	Brookings Health System	496	1.38%
6	Brookings School District 05-1	492	1.37%
7	Hy-Vee Food Store	450	1.25%
8	Larson Manufacturing	448	1.25%
9	Aramark	384	1.07%
10	Dacotah Bank Center	355	0.99%
—	Total	9,621	26.75%

Bel Brands USA, Inc., a subsidiary of Paris-based multinational Fromageries BEL or Bel Group, began commercial construction of a 170,000-square-foot Babybel cheese production plant in 2014 in the city's Foster Addition north of the Swiftel Center. The project added 250 new jobs in Brookings by the end of 2014. Rainbow Play Systems is also headquartered in Brookings.

=== Unemployment rate ===
The United States Department of Labor's Bureau of Labor Statistics unemployment rate (not seasonally adjusted).

Unemployment in Brookings
Calendar	Labor Force	Employment	Unemployment	Unemployment Rate
December 2024	13,995	13,648	347	2.5%
December 2023	13,483	13,219	264	2.0%

== Education ==
The Brookings School District, which includes almost all of the city limits, serves students in pre-kindergarten through twelfth grade. There were 3,446 students enrolled at the Brookings School District in the school year 2022–23.

- Brookings High School
- George S. Mickelson Middle School
- Camelot Intermediate School
- Dakota Prairie Elementary School
- Hillcrest Elementary School
- Medary Elementary School

A very small portion of the city limits extends into the Sioux Valley School District 05-5.

There is also a Catholic School hosted in St. Thomas More Catholic Church for students pre-kindergarten through fifth grade.

South Dakota State University, the state's largest college, is in Brookings. There were 12,065 students enrolled at SDSU in the Fall of 2024.

== Media ==
=== Newspaper ===
- The Brookings Register publishes Tuesdays and Fridays with a focus on local news and sports. It serves all of Brookings County and parts of Hamlin, Deuel, Kingsbury, Lake and Moody Counties in South Dakota and Lincoln County, Minnesota.
- The Brookings Beacon publishes weekly on Wednesdays. It was founded by former Brookings Register managing editor Josh Linehan in August 2025, after the Register's temporary closure.

=== AM Radio ===
AM radio stations
Frequency	Call sign	Name	Format	Owner	City
910 AM	KJJQ	The Ranch AM 910	Classic Country	Connoisseur Media	Volga/Brookings
1430 AM	KBRK	KBRK 1430 AM	Adult standards	Connoisseur Media	Brookings

=== FM Radio ===
FM radio stations
Frequency	Call sign	Name	Format	Owner	Target city/market	City of license
88.3 FM	KESD	South Dakota Public Broadcasting	NPR	SD Board of Directors for Educational Telecommunications	Brookings	Brookings
89.1 FM	K206EQ	VCY America	Christian; KVCH translator	VCY America, Inc.	Brookings	Brookings
89.7 FM	K209DX	Sonlife Radio	Christian; WJFM-FM translator	Jimmy Swaggart Ministries	Brookings	Brookings
90.7 FM	KSDJ	New Rock 90.7	Alternative/College	South Dakota State University	Brookings	Brookings
93.7 FM	KBRK-FM	B93.7	Hot Adult Contemporary	Connoisseur Media	Brookings	Brookings
95.5 FM	K238AX	Classical Minnesota Public Radio	Classical	Minnesota Public Radio	Brookings	Brookings
99.7 FM	KARZ	99.7 KARZ	Classic Hits	Linder Radio Group	Marshall/Brookings	Marshall, MN
102.3 FM	KKQQ	K-Country 102.3	Country	Connoisseur Media	Brookings	Volga
105.5 FM	K288EV	The Refuge	Contemporary Christian; WJRF-FM translator	Refuge Media Group	Brookings	Brookings
107.1 FM	KDBX	107.1 The Hawk	Classic Rock	Connoisseur Media	Brookings	Clear Lake

== Transportation ==
=== Roads ===
- Interstate 29-while Exits 132 and 133 both are located within the city limits, Exit 132 is the only one signed for Brookings
- U.S. Highway 14

- U.S. Highway 14 Bypass

=== Airport ===
Brookings Regional Airport serves the City of Brookings. A major reconstruction of the airport took place in 2012.

=== Transit ===
Intercity bus service to the city is provided by Jefferson Lines.

== Points of interest ==
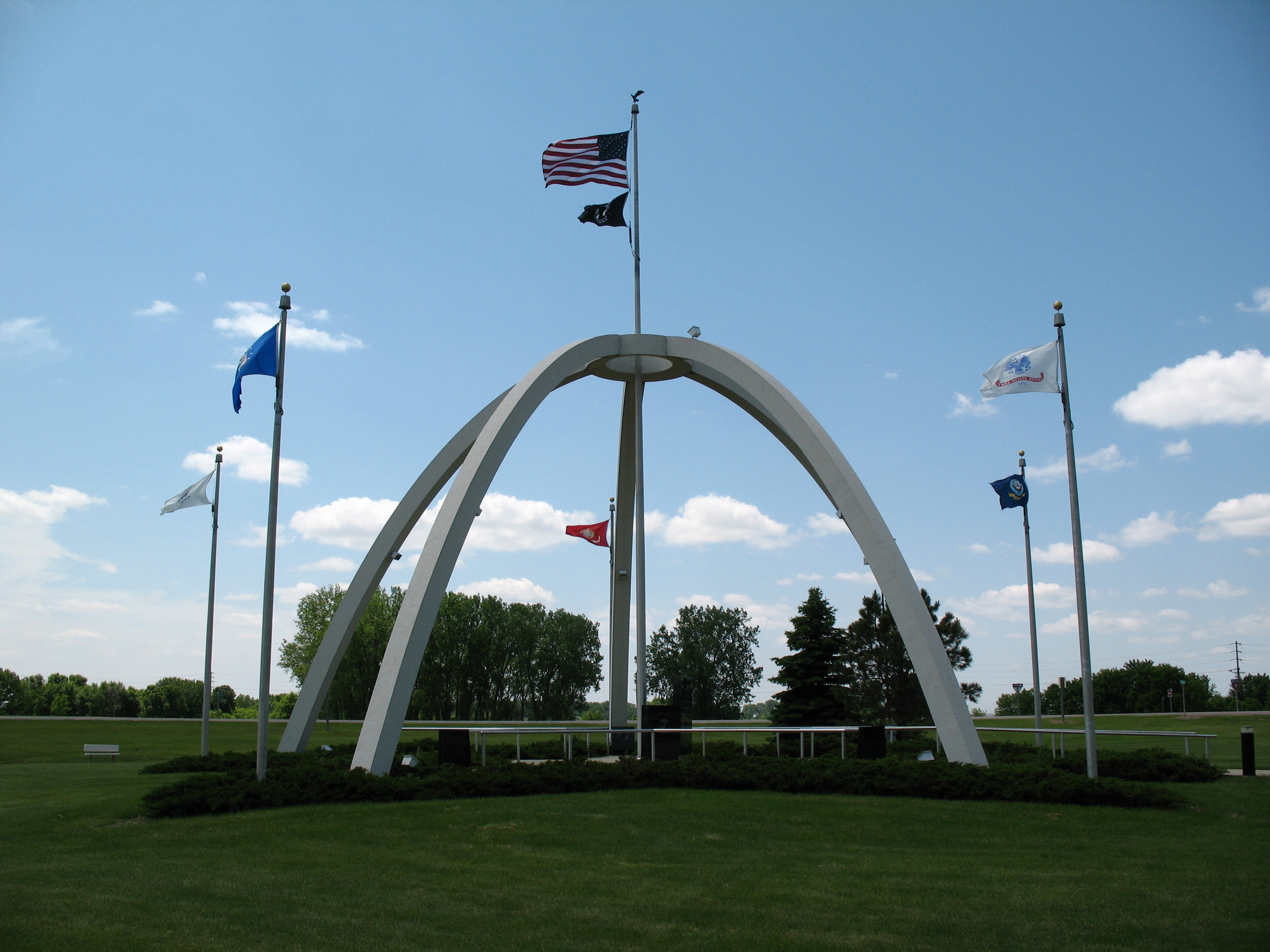
The veterans memorial in Brookings.

- McCrory Gardens and South Dakota Arboretum
- South Dakota Art Museum
- South Dakota Agricultural Heritage Museum
- Children's Museum of South Dakota
- Coughlin Campanile
- South Dakota State University
- Frost Arena
- Coughlin-Alumni Stadium
- Dana J. Dykhouse Stadium

== Notable people ==
- Jacob M. Appel, wrote portions of Coulrophobia & Fata Morgana in Brookings Public Library
- John Basinger, actor and writer, died in Brookings
- Stephen Foster Briggs, co-founder of Briggs & Stratton, educated in Brookings
- Jimmy Buffett, singer-songwriter, briefly lived in Brookings
- Robert H. Burris, biochemist, born and educated in Brookings
- Ray Ellefson, professional basketball player, born in Brookings
- Donald Evenson, biologist and chemist
- Geraldine Fenn, children's activist, born in Brookings
- Cheris Kramarae, co-author of A Feminist Dictionary, born in Brookings
- Herman Natwick, former mayor of Brookings
- Gene Okerlund, professional wrestling announcer, born in Brookings
