= Sinai, South Dakota =

Town in South Dakota, United States

- Town
- Location in Brookings County and the state of South Dakota
- Coordinates: 44°14′40″N 97°02′39″W
- Country: United States
- State: South Dakota
- County: Brookings
- Incorporated: 1908

Area
  - Total: 0.37 sq mi (0.95 km^{2})
  - Land: 0.37 sq mi (0.95 km^{2})
  - Water: 0 sq mi (0.00 km^{2})
- Elevation: 1,778 ft (542 m)

Population (2020)
  - Total: 99
  - Density: 269.2/sq mi (103.95/km^{2})
- Time zone: UTC-6 (Central (CST))
  - Summer (DST): UTC-5 (CDT)
- ZIP code: 57061
- Area code: 605
- FIPS code: 46-58900
- GNIS feature ID: 1267565

Sinai (/ˈsaɪniaɪ/ SY-nee-eye) is a town in Brookings County, South Dakota, United States. The population was 99 at the 2020 census.

== Geography ==
According to the United States Census Bureau, the town has a total area of 0.37 square miles (0.96 km^{2}), all land.

== Demographics ==
Historical population
Census	Pop.	Note	%±
1920	216		—
1930	217		0.5%
1940	182		−16.1%
1950	181		−0.5%
1960	166		−8.3%
1970	147		−11.4%
1980	129		−12.2%
1990	120		−7.0%
2000	133		10.8%
2010	120		−9.8%
2020	99		−17.5%
U.S. Decennial Census

=== 2010 census ===
As of the census of 2010, there were 120 people, 52 households, and 32 families residing in the town. The population density was 324.3 inhabitants per square mile (125.2/km^{2}). There were 61 housing units at an average density of 164.9 per square mile (63.7/km^{2}). The racial makeup of the town was 96.7% White, 0.8% Asian, and 2.5% from two or more races. Hispanic or Latino of any race were 1.7% of the population.

There were 52 households, of which 36.5% had children under the age of 18 living with them, 50.0% were married couples living together, 3.8% had a female householder with no husband present, 7.7% had a male householder with no wife present, and 38.5% were non-families. 38.5% of all households were made up of individuals, and 9.6% had someone living alone who was 65 years of age or older. The average household size was 2.31 and the average family size was 3.00.

The median age in the town was 37 years. 28.3% of residents were under the age of 18; 5.1% were between the ages of 18 and 24; 26.6% were from 25 to 44; 27.5% were from 45 to 64; and 12.5% were 65 years of age or older. The gender makeup of the town was 55.0% male and 45.0% female.

=== 2000 census ===
As of the census of 2000, there were 133 people, 54 households, and 42 families residing in the town. The population density was 364.0 inhabitants per square mile (140.5/km^{2}). There were 62 housing units at an average density of 169.7 per square mile (65.5/km^{2}). The racial makeup of the town was 100.00% White.

There were 54 households, out of which 31.5% had children under the age of 18 living with them, 75.9% were married couples living together, and 22.2% were non-families. 18.5% of all households were made up of individuals, and 13.0% had someone living alone who was 65 years of age or older. The average household size was 2.46 and the average family size was 2.83.

In the town, the population was spread out, with 24.8% under the age of 18, 9.0% from 18 to 24, 24.8% from 25 to 44, 24.8% from 45 to 64, and 16.5% who were 65 years of age or older. The median age was 36 years. For every 100 females, there were 121.7 males. For every 100 females age 18 and over, there were 108.3 males.

The median income for a household in the town was $38,000, and the median income for a family was $39,750. Males had a median income of $31,875 versus $23,750 for females. The per capita income for the town was $17,451. There were 4.3% of families and 5.7% of the population living below the poverty line, including 5.7% of under eighteens and none of those over 64.

== History ==
Sinai was laid out in 1907, and named after the Biblical Mount Sinai.

== Education ==
It is in the Sioux Valley School District 05-5.
