= Bruce, South Dakota =

- City
- Motto: "A honey of a place to bee."
- Location in Brookings County and the state of South Dakota
- Coordinates: 44°26′16″N 96°53′26″W
- Country: United States
- State: South Dakota
- County: Brookings

Area
  - Total: 0.37 sq mi (0.96 km^{2})
  - Land: 0.37 sq mi (0.96 km^{2})
  - Water: 0 sq mi (0.00 km^{2})
- Elevation: 1,624 ft (495 m)

Population (2020)
  - Total: 210
  - Density: 567.5/sq mi (219.11/km^{2})
- Time zone: UTC-6 (Central (CST))
  - Summer (DST): UTC-5 (CDT)
- ZIP code: 57220
- Area code: 605
- FIPS code: 46-07740
- GNIS feature ID: 1267300
- Website: www.cityofbruce.net

Bruce is a city in Brookings County, South Dakota, United States. The population was 210 at the 2020 census.

== History ==
Bruce was originally called Lie, and under the latter name was founded in 1881. It was renamed in 1883, but the namesake is unclear. Some hold Bruce was named for the son of an early Chicago Northwestern railroad official, while others believe it was named for Blanche K. Bruce, an African-American statesman and friend of Roscoe Conkling, U.S. Senator from New York at the time.

== Geography ==
Bruce is located along the Big Sioux River.

According to the United States Census Bureau, the city has a total area of 0.38 square miles (0.98 km^{2}), of which 0.37 square miles (0.96 km^{2}) is land and 0.01 square miles (0.03 km^{2}) is water.

== Demographics ==
Historical population
Census	Pop.	Note	%±
1910	262		—
1920	342		30.5%
1930	371		8.5%
1940	394		6.2%
1950	305		−22.6%
1960	272		−10.8%
1970	217		−20.2%
1980	254		17.1%
1990	235		−7.5%
2000	272		15.7%
2010	204		−25.0%
2020	210		2.9%
U.S. Decennial Census

=== 2020 census ===
As of the 2020 census, Bruce had a population of 210. The median age was 43.3 years. 17.6% of residents were under the age of 18 and 20.0% of residents were 65 years of age or older. For every 100 females there were 112.1 males, and for every 100 females age 18 and over there were 119.0 males age 18 and over.

0.0% of residents lived in urban areas, while 100.0% lived in rural areas.

There were 110 households in Bruce, of which 26.4% had children under the age of 18 living in them. Of all households, 44.5% were married-couple households, 30.0% were households with a male householder and no spouse or partner present, and 20.9% were households with a female householder and no spouse or partner present. About 43.6% of all households were made up of individuals and 18.2% had someone living alone who was 65 years of age or older.

There were 117 housing units, of which 6.0% were vacant. The homeowner vacancy rate was 1.2% and the rental vacancy rate was 3.2%.

Racial composition as of the 2020 census
Race	Number	Percent
White	184	87.6%
Black or African American	1	0.5%
American Indian and Alaska Native	0	0.0%
Asian	0	0.0%
Native Hawaiian and Other Pacific Islander	0	0.0%
Some other race	13	6.2%
Two or more races	12	5.7%
Hispanic or Latino (of any race)	19	9.0%

=== 2010 census ===
As of the census of 2010, there were 204 people, 95 households, and 58 families residing in the city. The population density was 551.4 inhabitants per square mile (212.9/km^{2}). There were 111 housing units at an average density of 300.0 per square mile (115.8/km^{2}). The racial makeup of the city was 95.6% White, 1.5% Native American, 0.5% Asian, 0.5% Pacific Islander, and 2.0% from two or more races. Hispanic or Latino of any race were 0.5% of the population.

There were 95 households, of which 29.5% had children under the age of 18 living with them, 52.6% were married couples living together, 4.2% had a female householder with no husband present, 4.2% had a male householder with no wife present, and 38.9% were non-families. 34.7% of all households were made up of individuals, and 11.6% had someone living alone who was 65 years of age or older. The average household size was 2.15 and the average family size was 2.78.

The median age in the city was 43 years. 24.5% of residents were under the age of 18; 3.1% were between the ages of 18 and 24; 27.5% were from 25 to 44; 29.5% were from 45 to 64; and 15.7% were 65 years of age or older. The gender makeup of the city was 49.0% male and 51.0% female.

=== 2000 census ===
As of the census of 2000, there were 272 people, 105 households, and 72 families residing in the city. The population density was 761.8 people per square mile (291.7 per km^{2}). There were 117 housing units at an average density of 327.7 per square mile (125.5 per km^{2}). The racial makeup of the city was 99.26% White, 0.37% Asian, and 0.37% from two or more races. Hispanic or Latino of any race were 1.47% of the population.

There were 105 households, out of which 39.0% had children under the age of 18 living with them, 61.9% were married couples living together, 4.8% had a female householder with no husband present, and 30.5% were non-families. 29.5% of all households were made up of individuals, and 9.5% had someone living alone who was 65 years of age or older. The average household size was 2.59 and the average family size was 3.21.

In the city, the population was spread out, with 31.3% under the age of 18, 4.4% from 18 to 24, 30.1% from 25 to 44, 20.2% from 45 to 64, and 14.0% who were 65 years of age or older. The median age was 34 years. For every 100 females, there were 100.0 males. For every 100 females age 18 and over, there were 107.8 males.

The median income for a household in the city was $37,188, and the median income for a family was $46,786. Males had a median income of $31,071 versus $23,750 for females. The per capita income for the city was $16,282. About 4.1% of families and 7.3% of the population were below the poverty line, including 9.3% of those under the age of eighteen and none of those 65 or over.

=== Honey Days Festival ===
During the last week of July, Bruce celebrates Honey Days, its town holiday. The name and theme of Honey Days is inspired by the company Adee Honey Farms which originated and is based in Bruce. Adee Honey farms is the largest producer of honey in the world and is a large employer in the small town. The festival features many activities such as a street dance, bingo, barbecue feed, pancake breakfast, an outdoor church service, and many recreational tournaments such as softball, horseshoes, volleyball, and beanbags. Honey Days also displays a large parade on its main street.

== Education ==
It is in the Sioux Valley School District 05-5.
