= KBRK (AM) =

Radio station in Brookings, South Dakota

- Brookings, South Dakota; United States
- Frequency: 1430 kHz
- Branding: KBRK 1430 AM

Programming
- Format: Adult standards

Ownership
- Owner: Connoisseur Media; (Alpha 3E License, LLC)
- Sister stations: KBRK-FM; KDBX; KJJQ; KKQQ

History
- First air date: July 1, 1955
- Call sign meaning: Brookings

Technical information
- Licensing authority: FCC
- Facility ID: 15263
- Class: D
- Power: 1,000 watts day; 100 watts night
- Transmitter coordinates: 44°18′11.9″N 96°46′2.2″W

Links
- Public license information: Public file; LMS
- Webcast: Listen live
- Website: www.brookingsradio.com/stations/kbrk-1430am/

KBRK (1430 kHz) is an AM radio station in Brookings, South Dakota, United States. It was founded on July 15, 1955. The studios were originally located in downtown Brookings, but later moved to the transmitter site, near the edge of town. KBRK continues to broadcast music, news, sports, and a number of public events throughout the Brookings region and surrounding communities. The tower height is 160 feet (49 m).

== Format ==
KBRK plays a mix of both soft rock and big band music targeted at the above 35 age demographic. The station also broadcasts a wide range of local sporting events for the surrounding region, specializing in high school-level athletic events for the Brookings community. KBRK originates local news broadcasts and local area weather coverage as well. World and national news comes via CBS News Radio.
