= List of contraltos in non-classical music =

The contralto singing voice has a vocal range that lies between the F below "middle C" (F_{3}) to two Fs above middle C (F_{5}) and is the lowest type of female voice. In the lower and upper extremes, some contralto voices can sing from two Bs below middle C (B_{2}) to two B♭s above middle C (B♭_{5}).

The term contralto was developed in relation to classical and operatic voices, where the classification is based not merely on the singer's vocal range but also on the tessitura and timbre of the voice. For classical and operatic singers, their voice type determines the roles they will sing and is a primary method of categorization. In classical music, a "pure" contralto is considered the rarest type of female voice. In non-classical music, singers are primarily defined by their genre and their gender, not their vocal range. When the terms soprano, mezzo-soprano, contralto, tenor, baritone, and bass are used as descriptors of non-classical voices, they are applied more loosely than they would be to those of classical singers and generally refer only to the singer's perceived vocal range. Contemporarily, the informal term alto is sometimes used interchangeably with contralto.

The following is a list of singers in country, popular music, jazz, and musical theatre (Note: For a detailed description of the differences between the operatic and musical theatre voice see Björkner, Eva, Why so different? Aspects of voice characteristics in operatic and musical theatre singing, KTH School of Computer Science and Communication, 2006 (ISBN 9171785183)) who have been described as contraltos.

== List of names ==
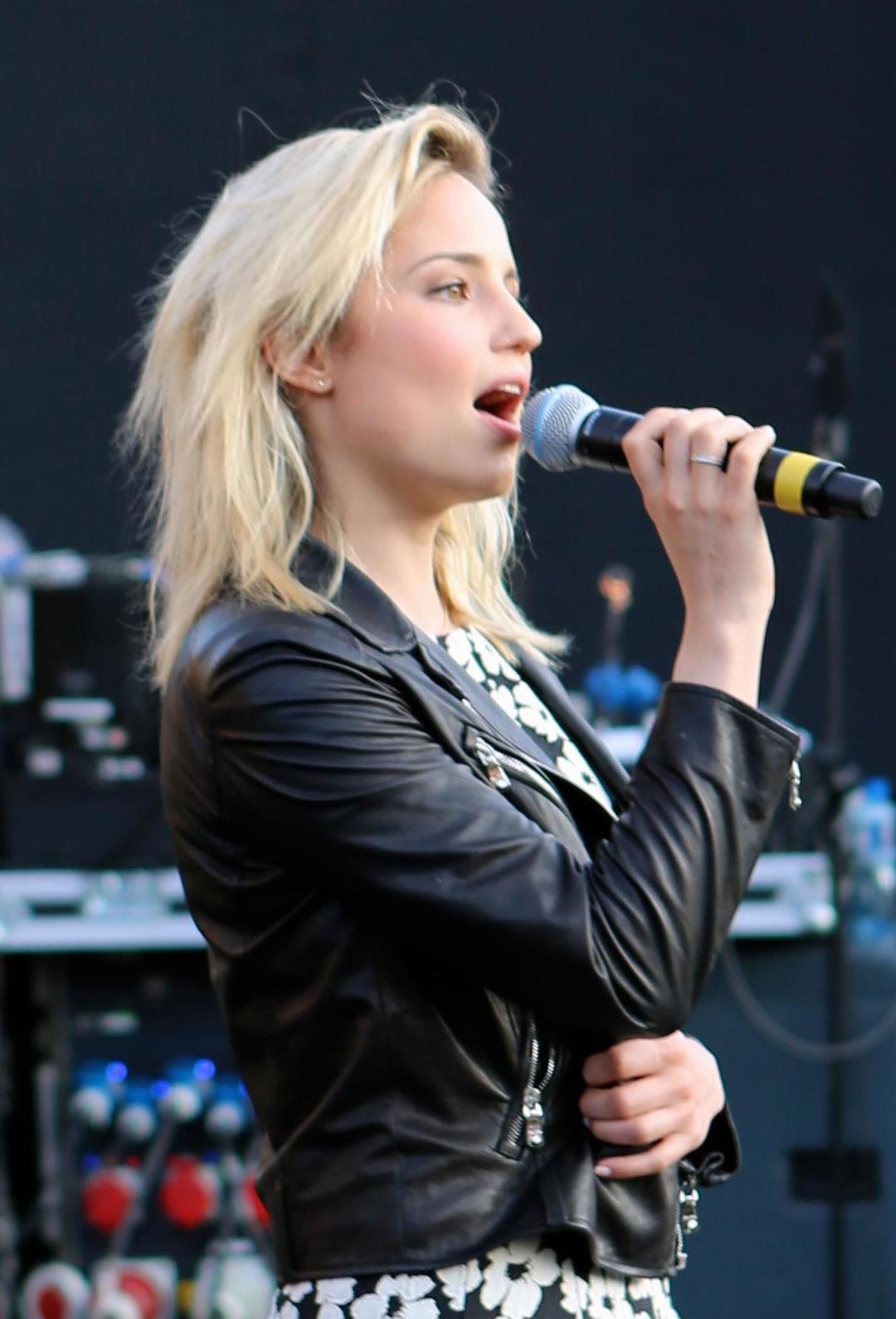
Dianna Agron

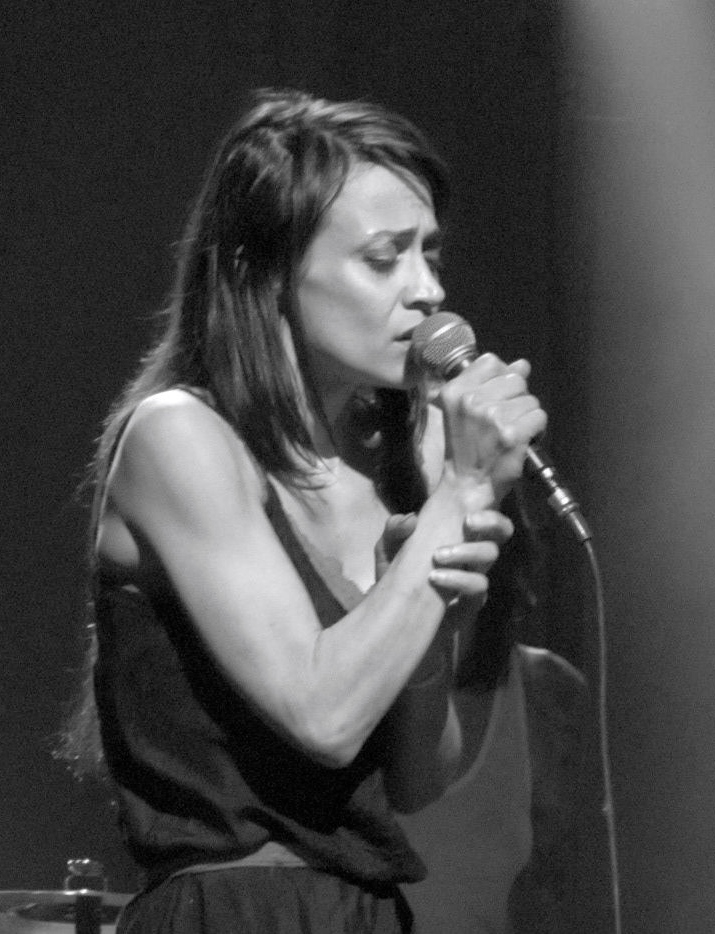
Fiona Apple

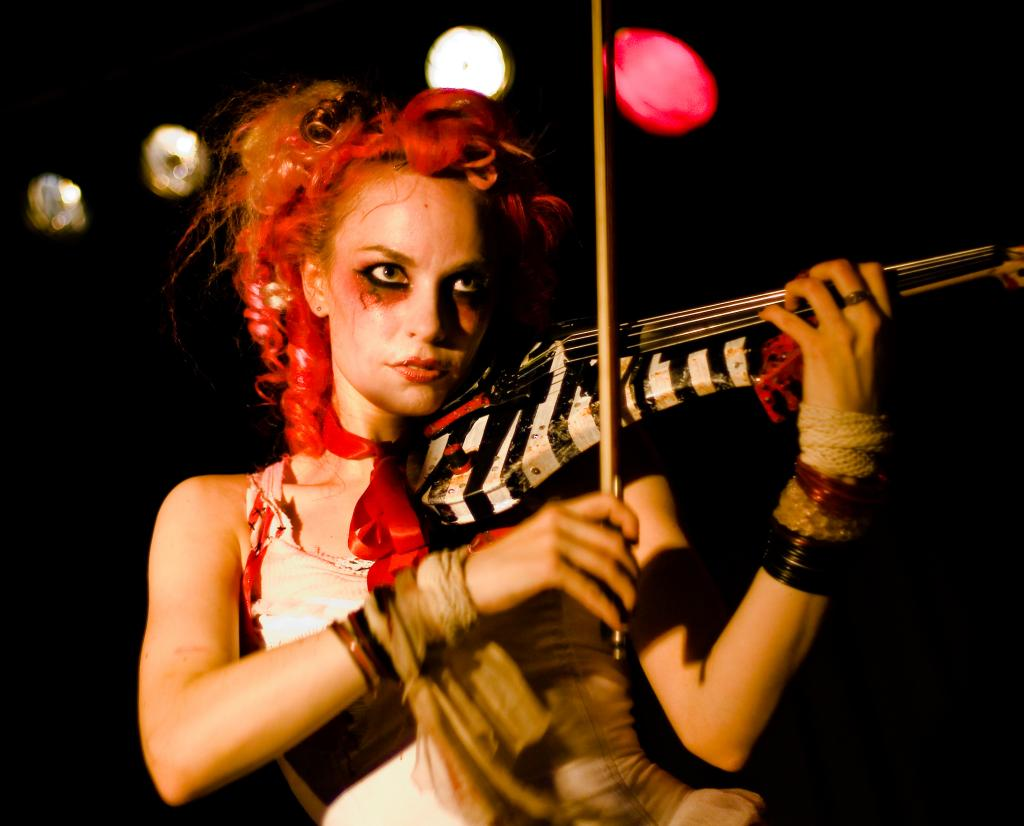
Emilie Autumn

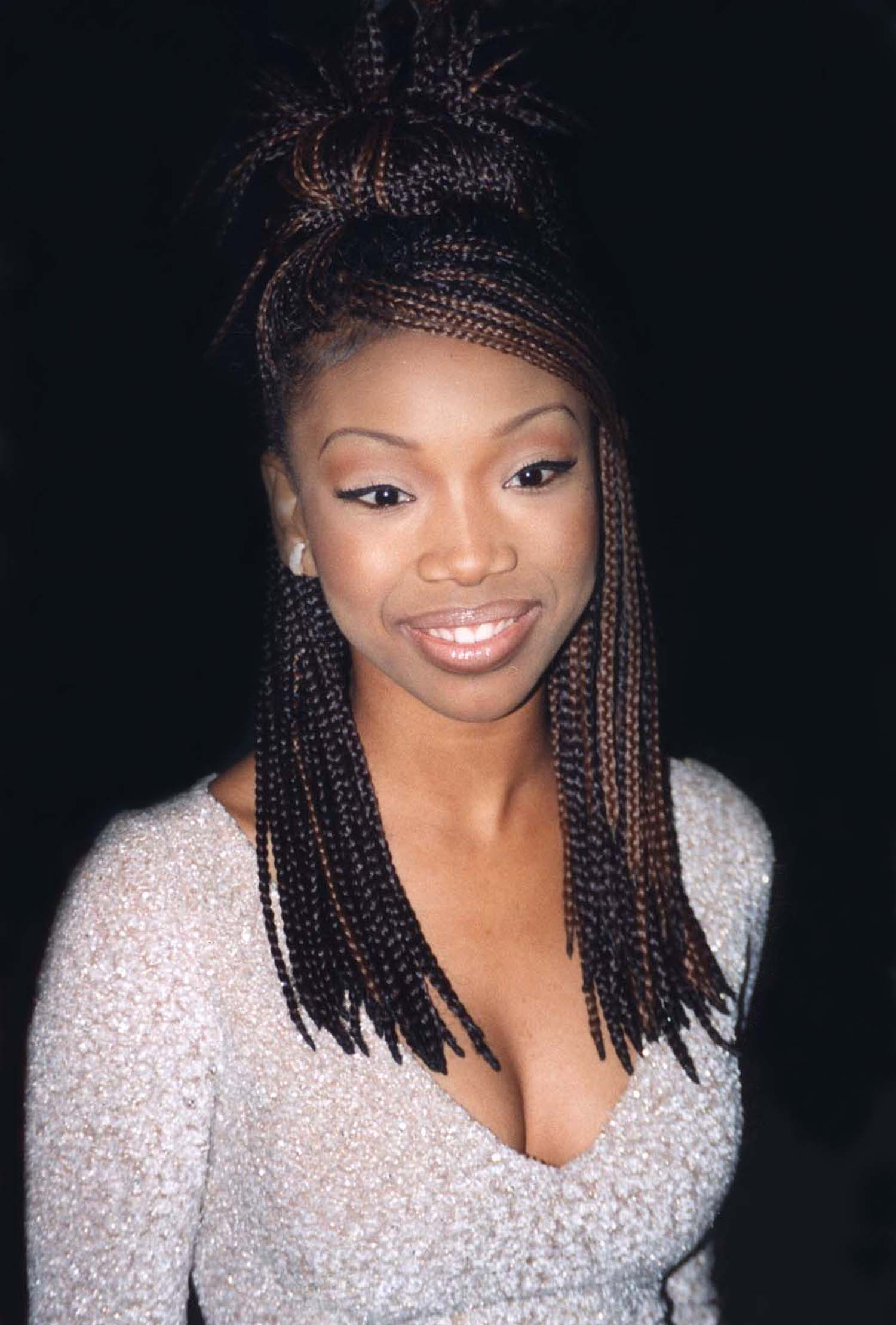
Brandy

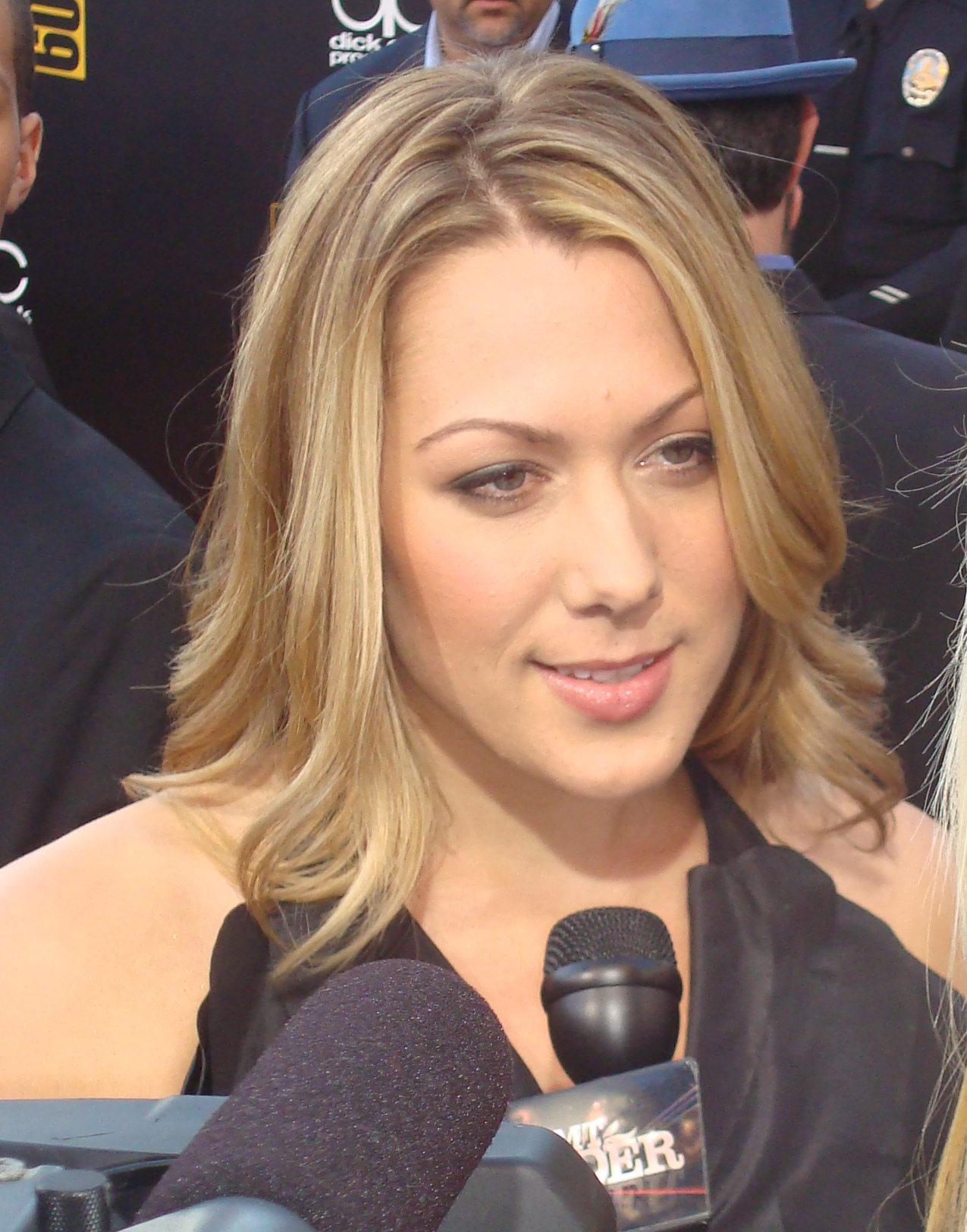
Colbie Caillat

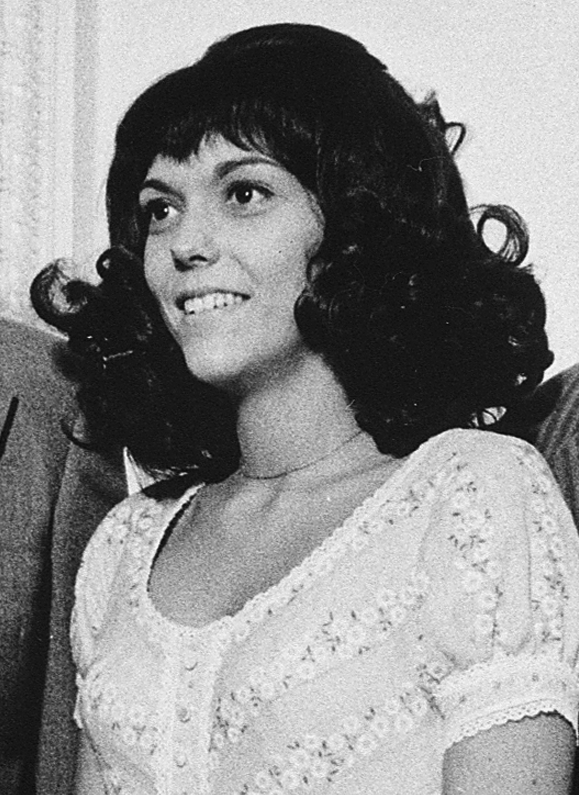
Karen Carpenter

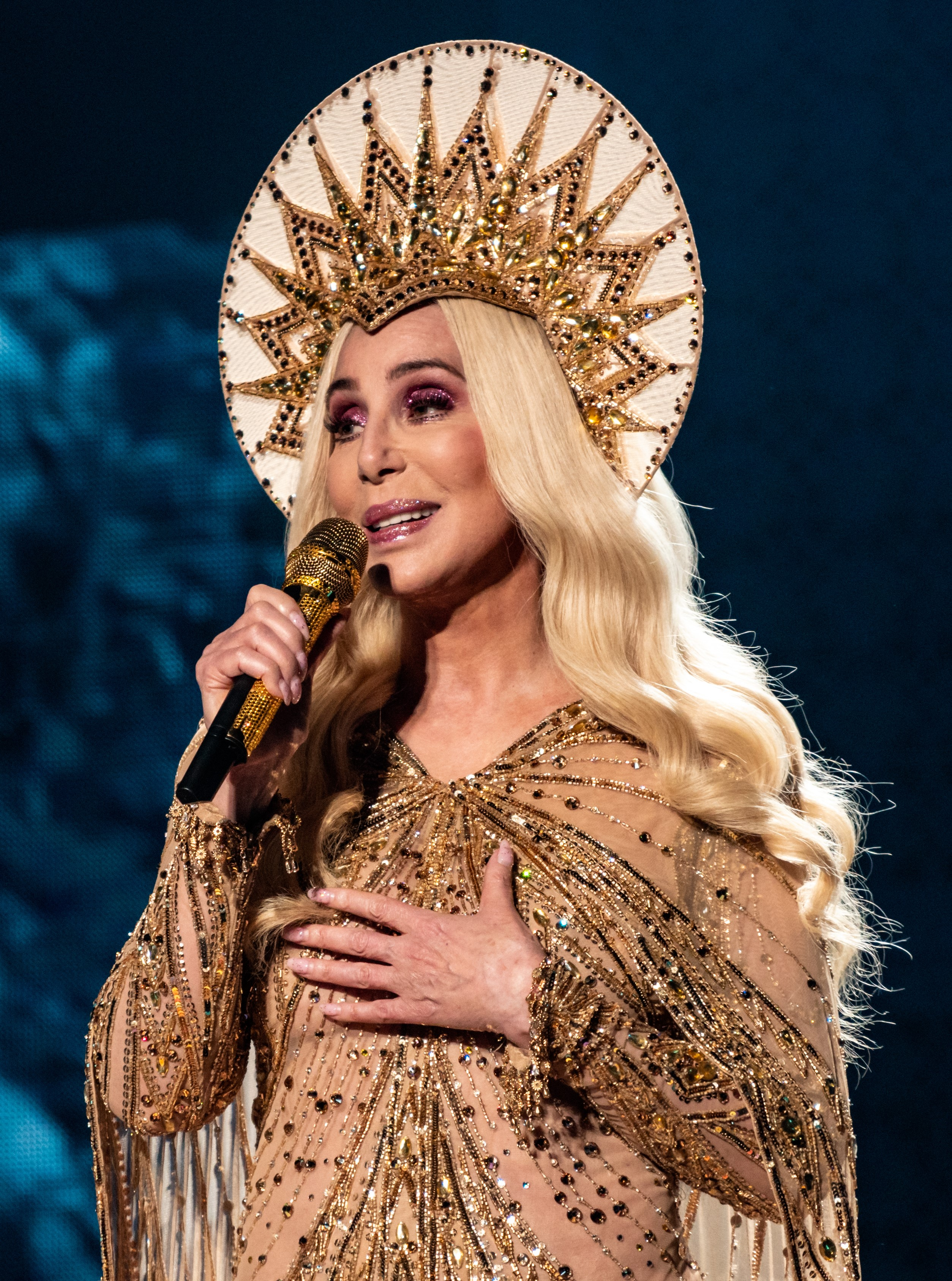
Cher

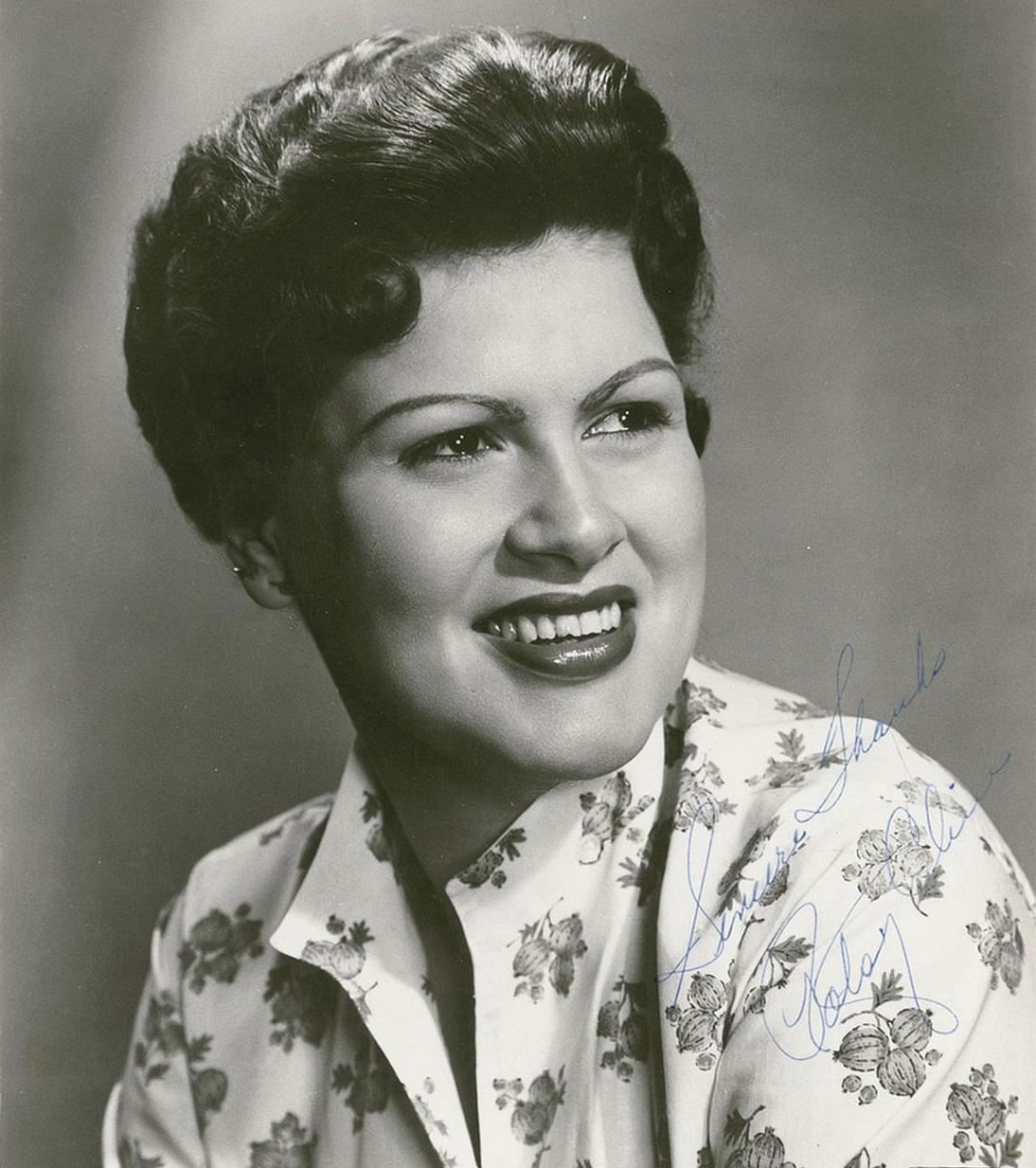
Patsy Cline

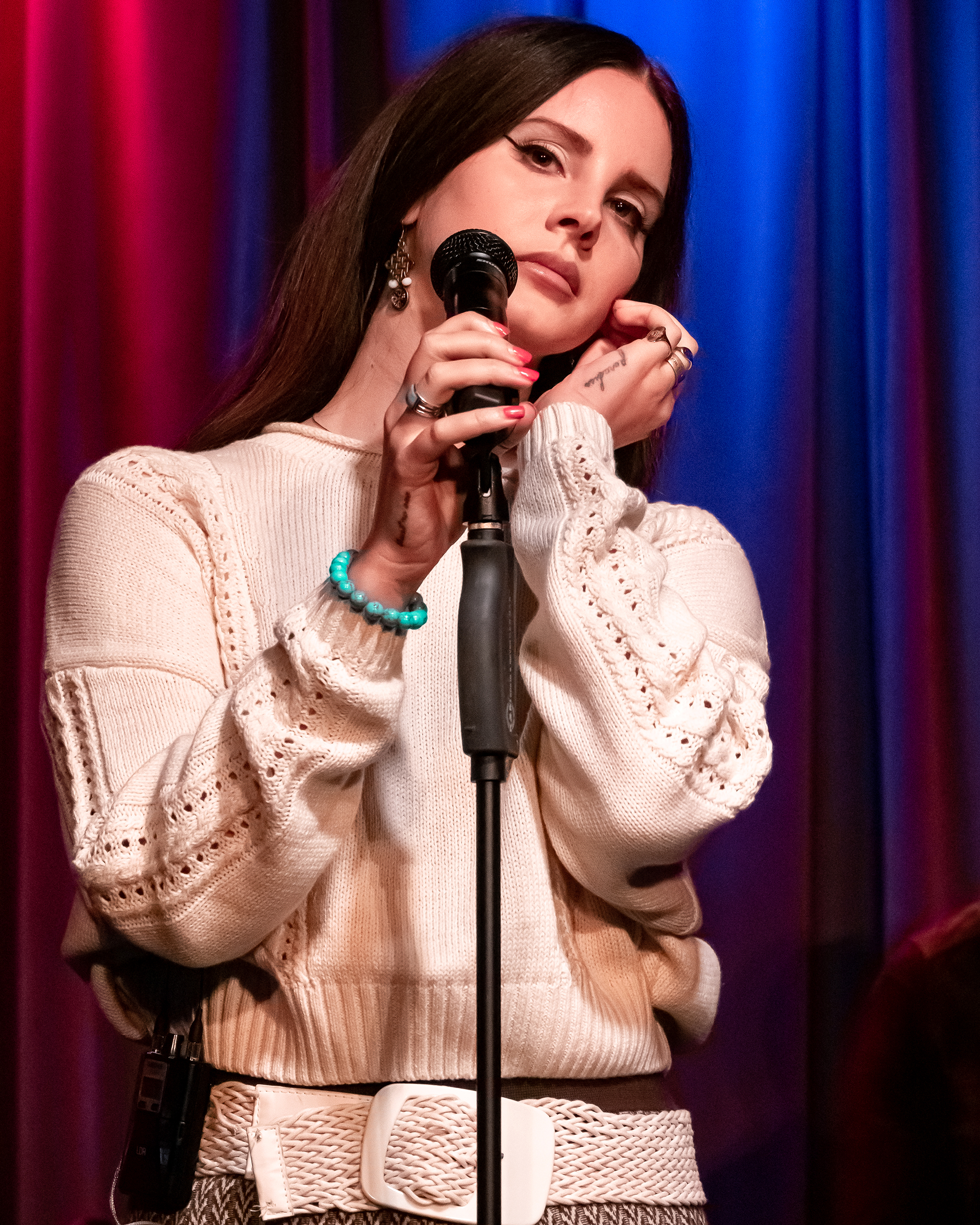
Lana Del Rey

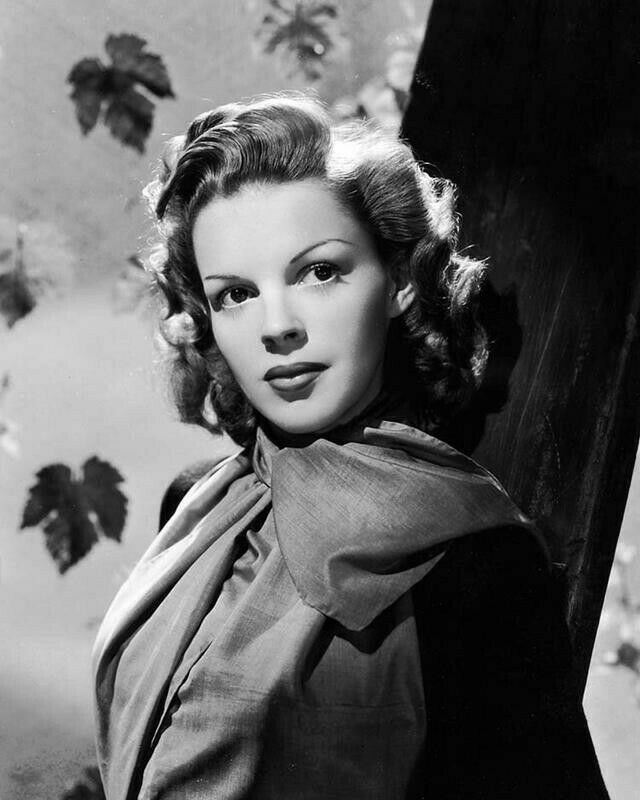
Judy Garland

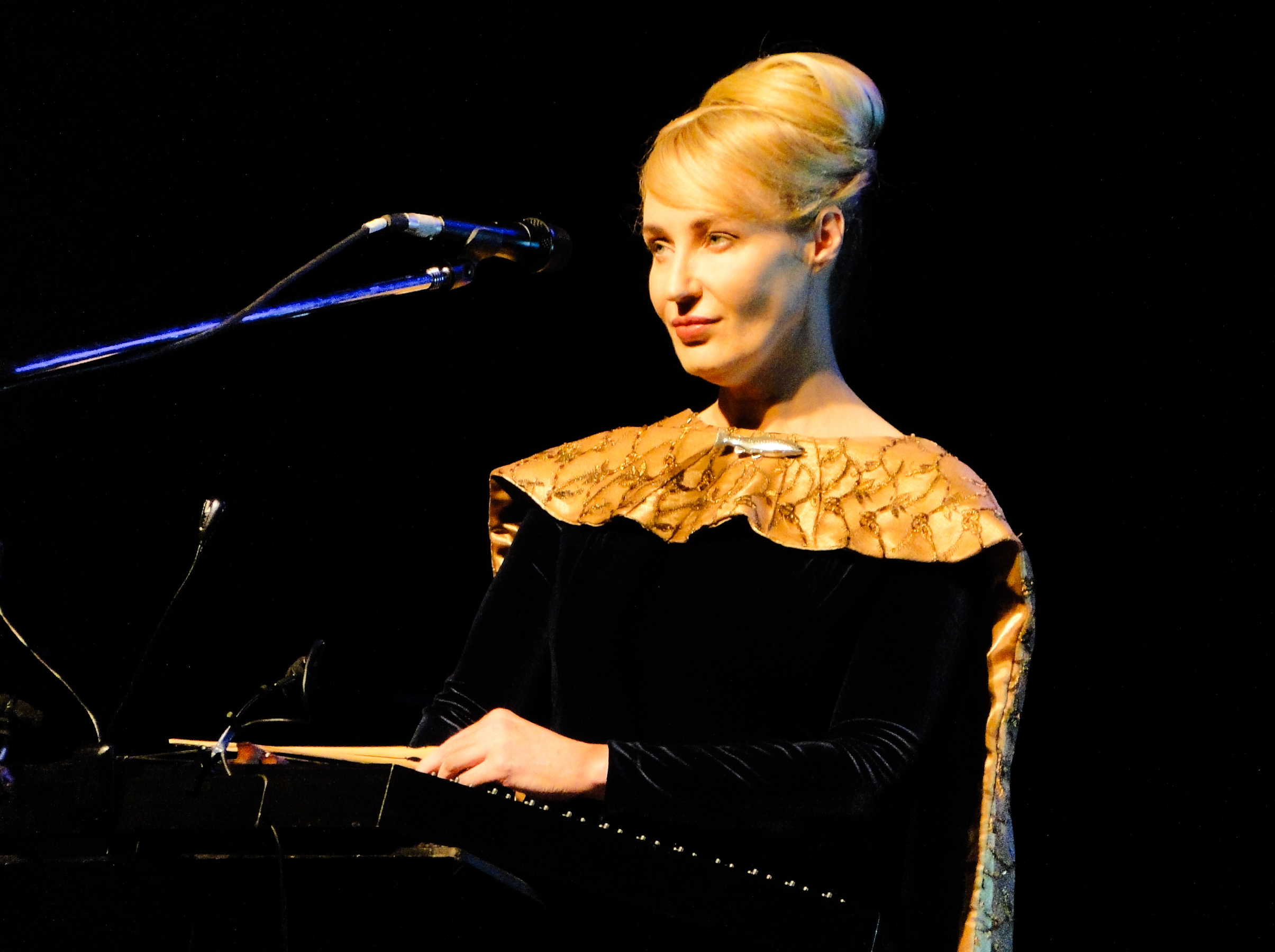
Lisa Gerrard

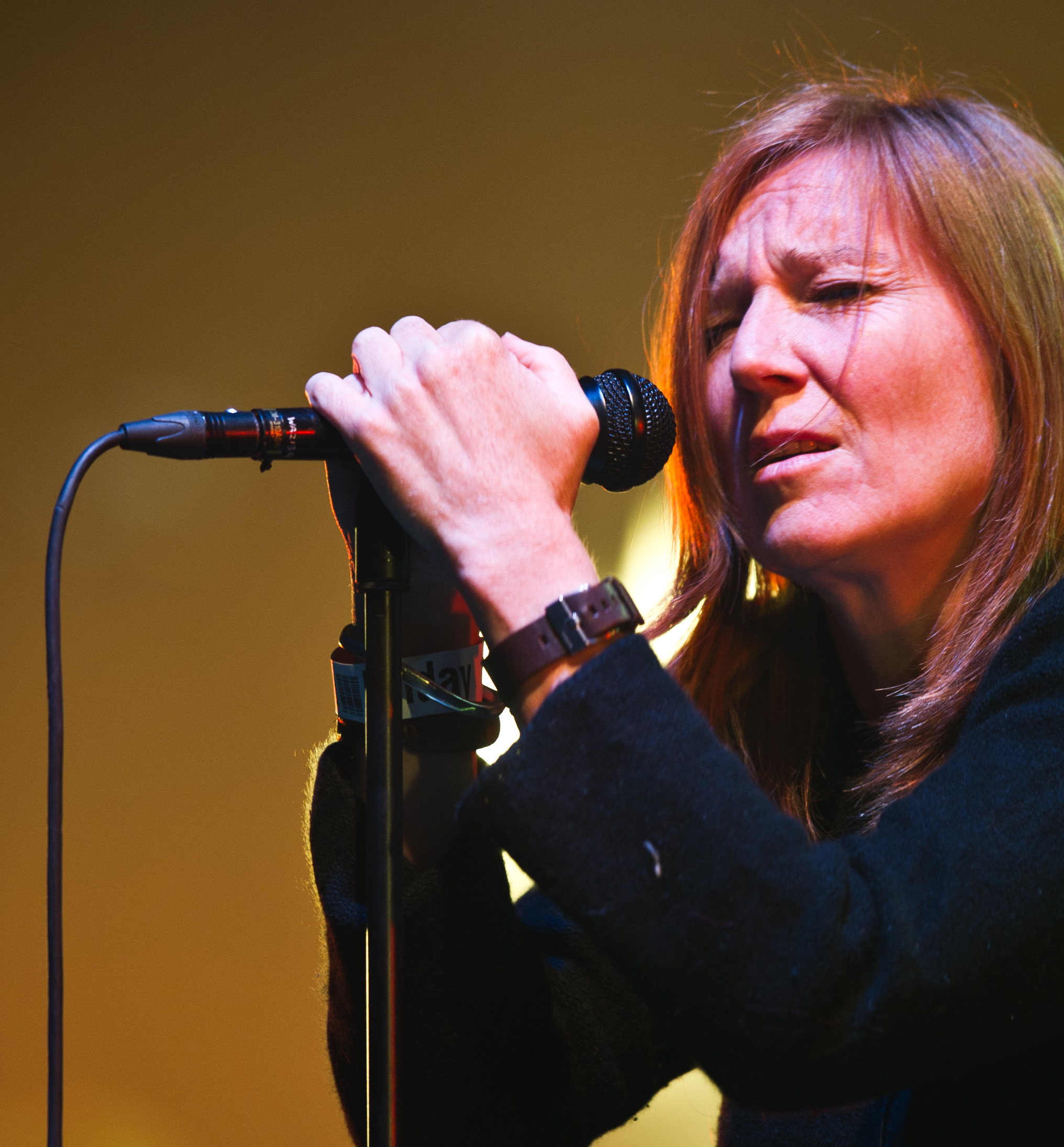
Beth Gibbons

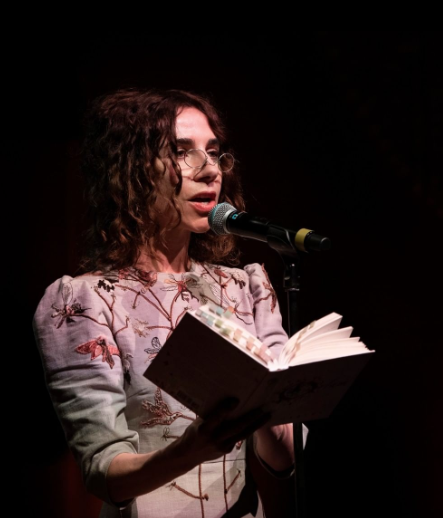
PJ Harvey

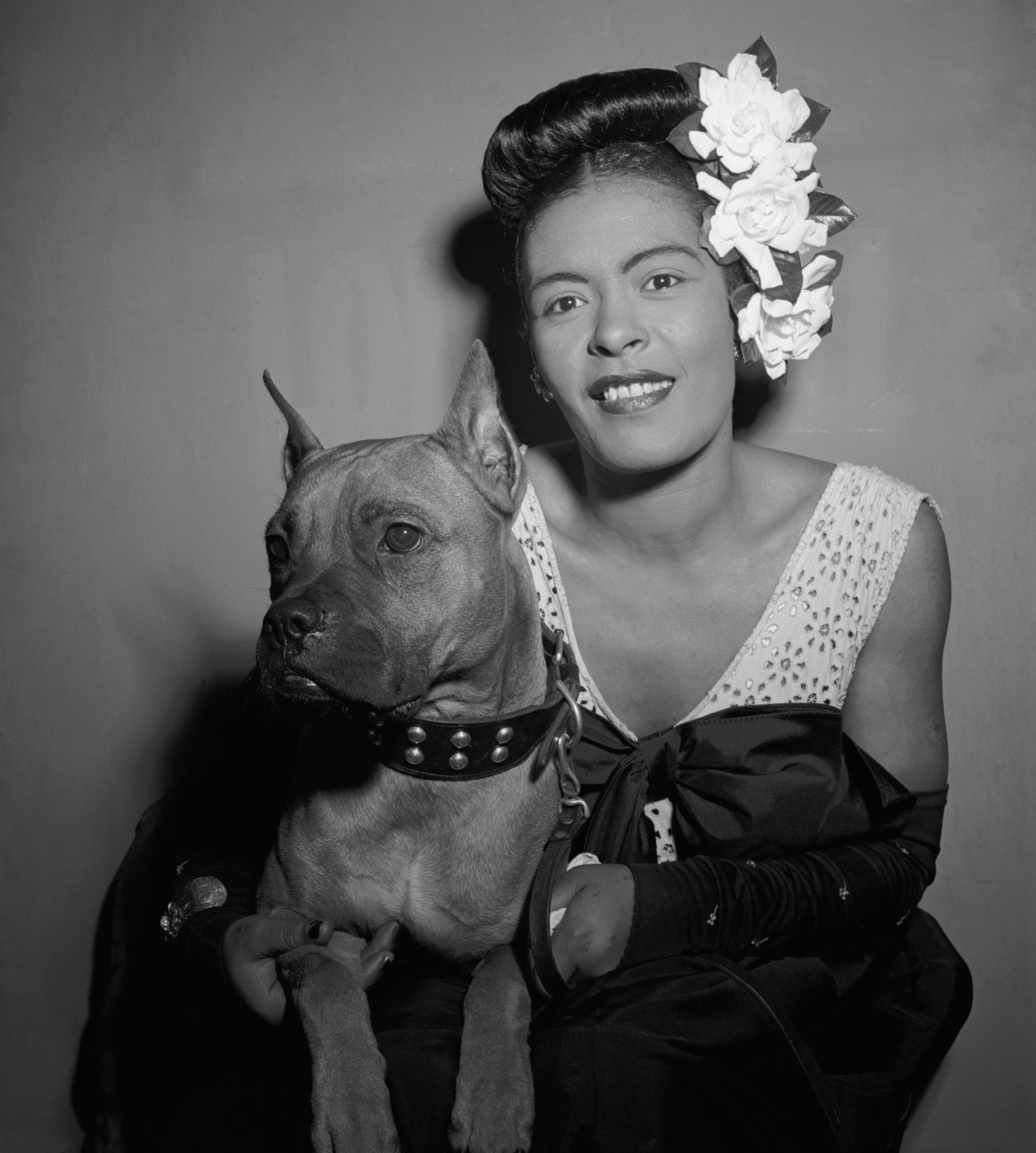
Billie Holiday

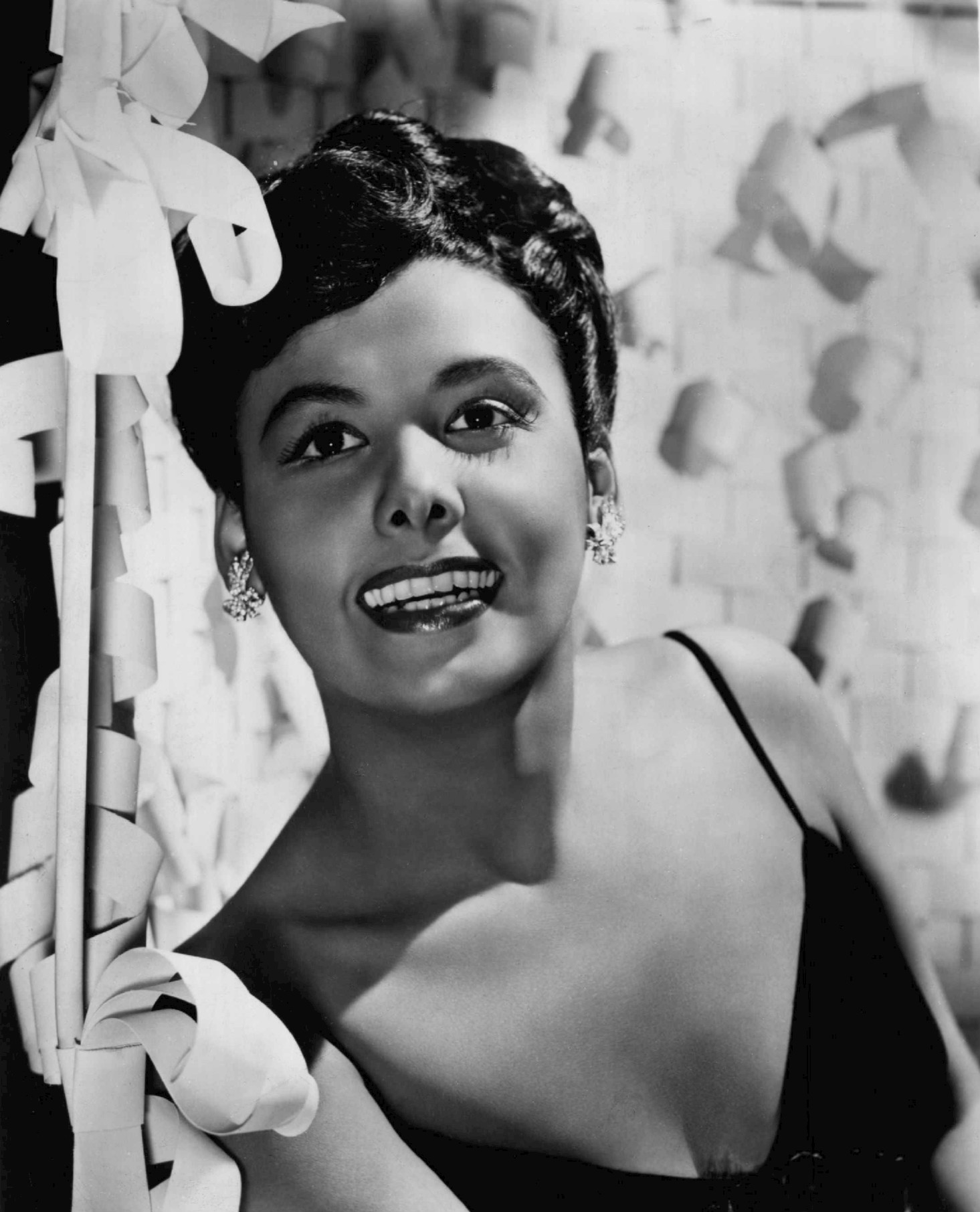
Lena Horne

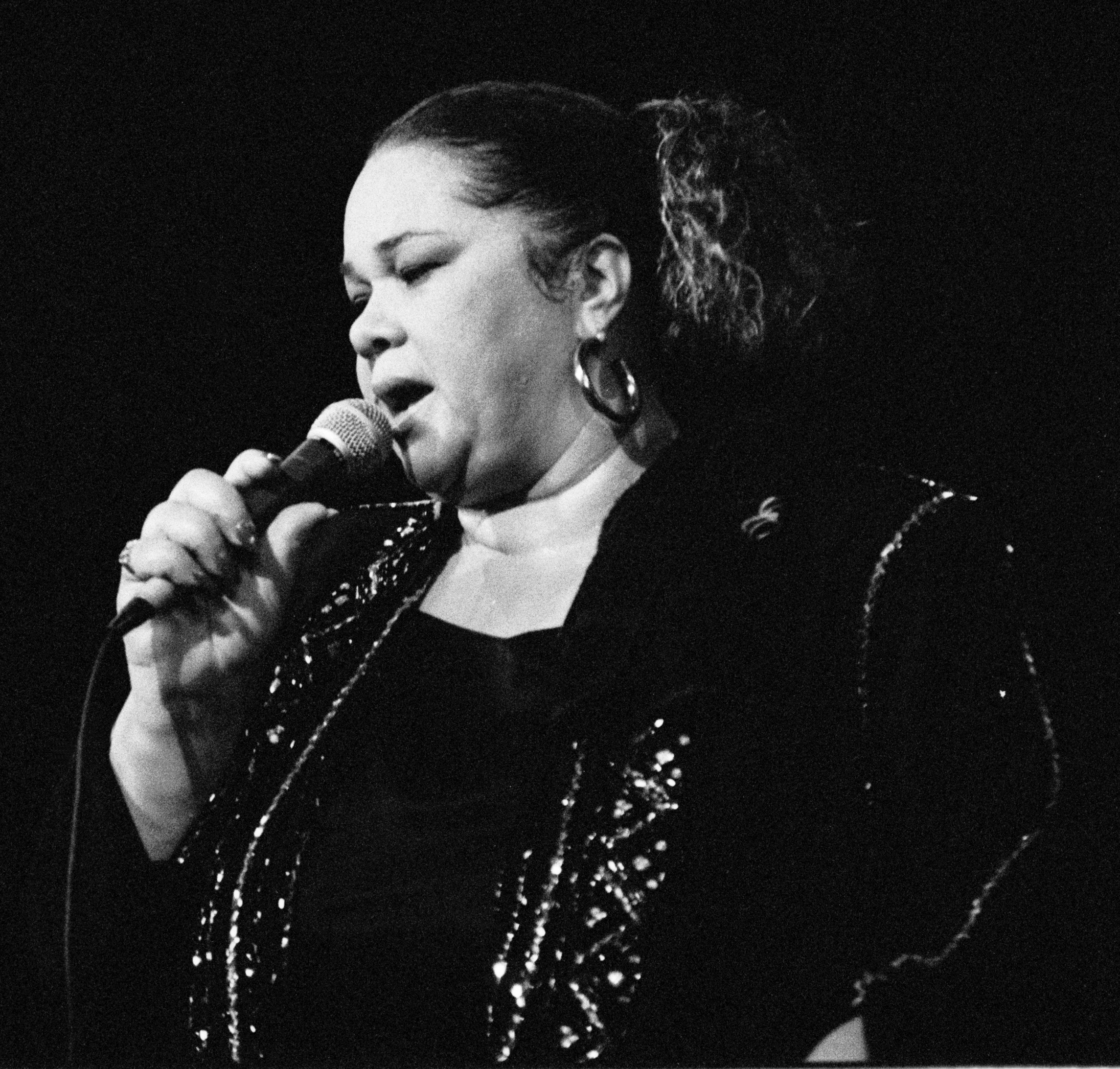
Etta James

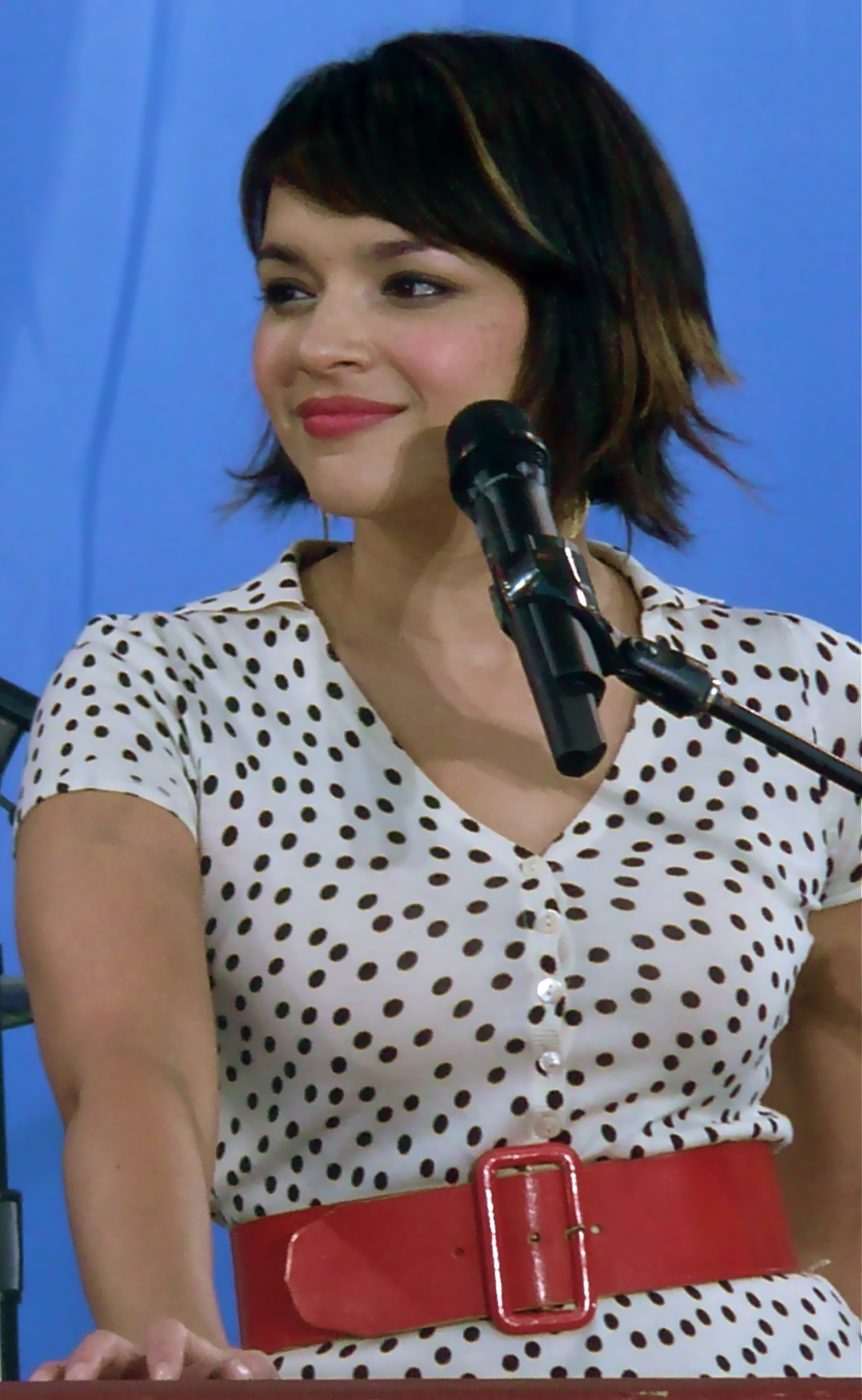
Norah Jones

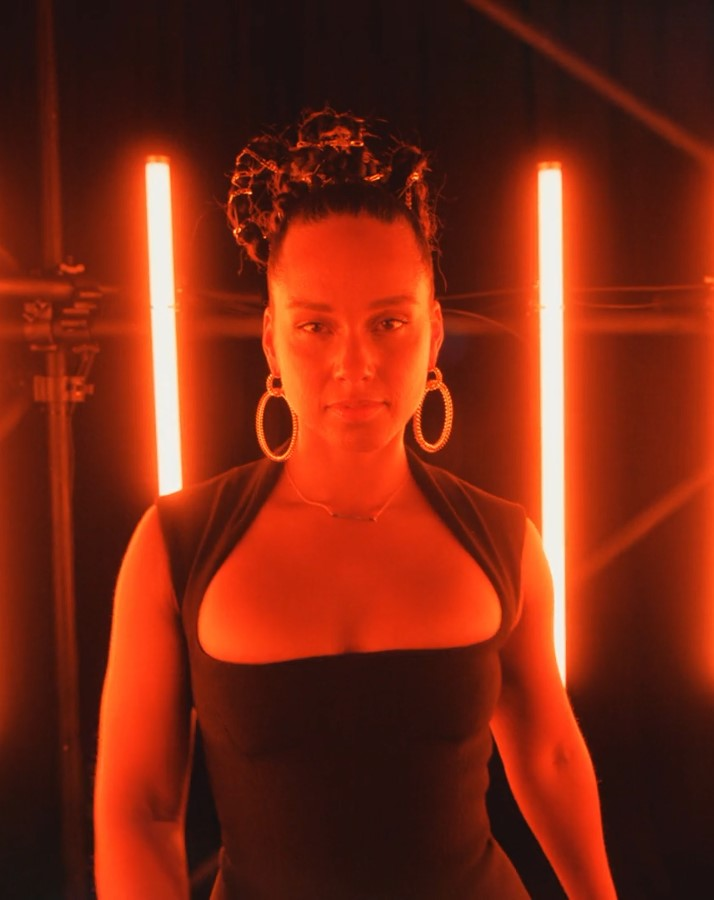
Alicia Keys

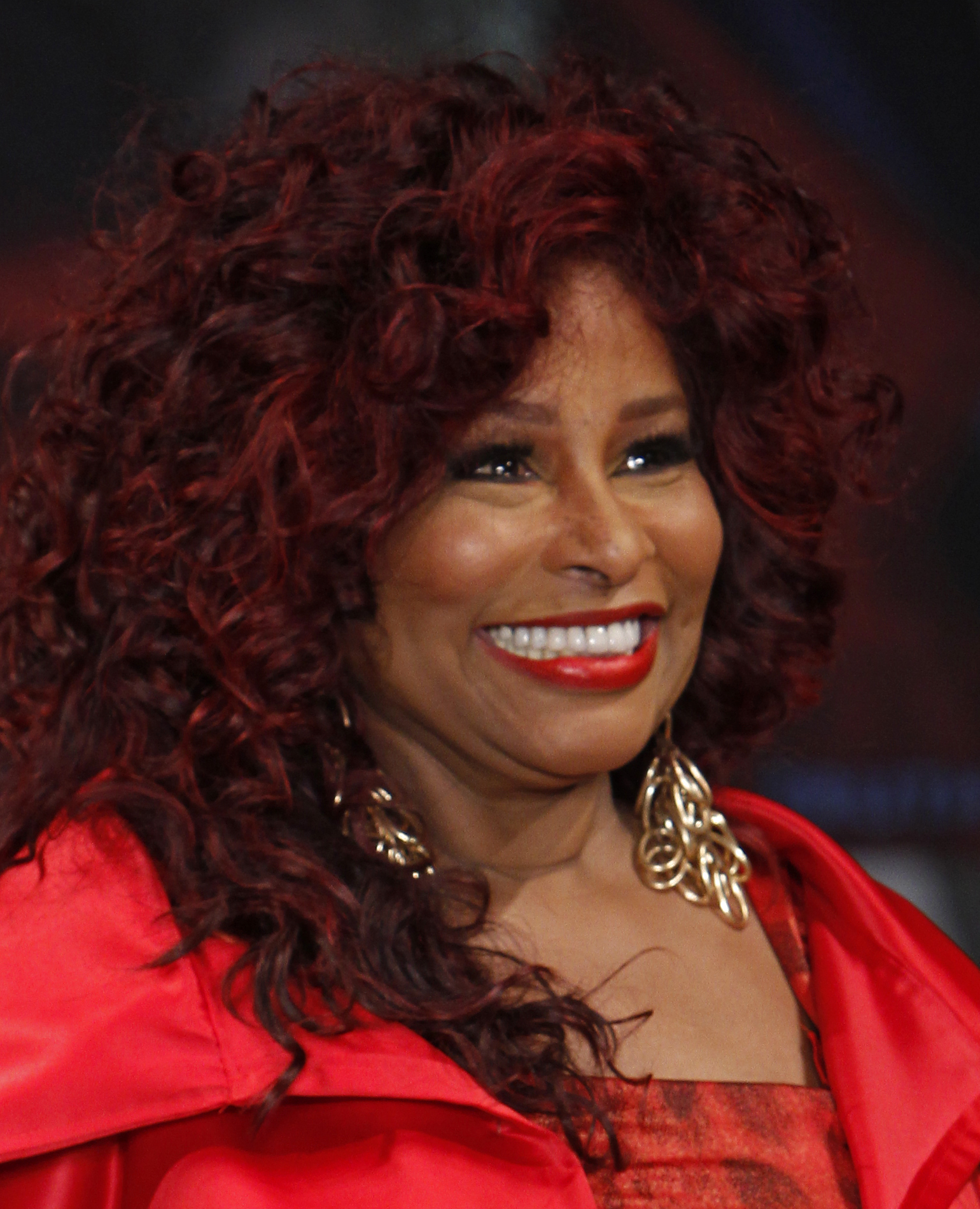
Chaka Khan

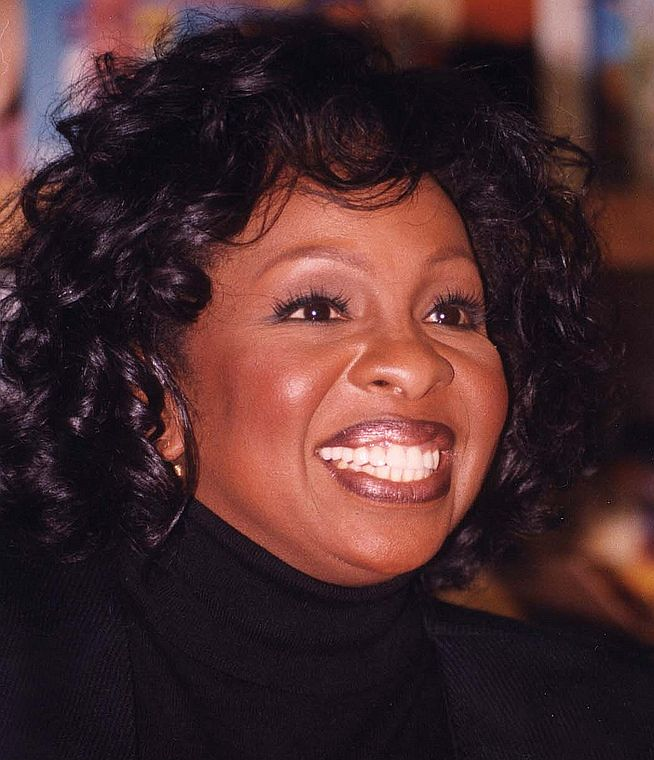
Gladys Knight

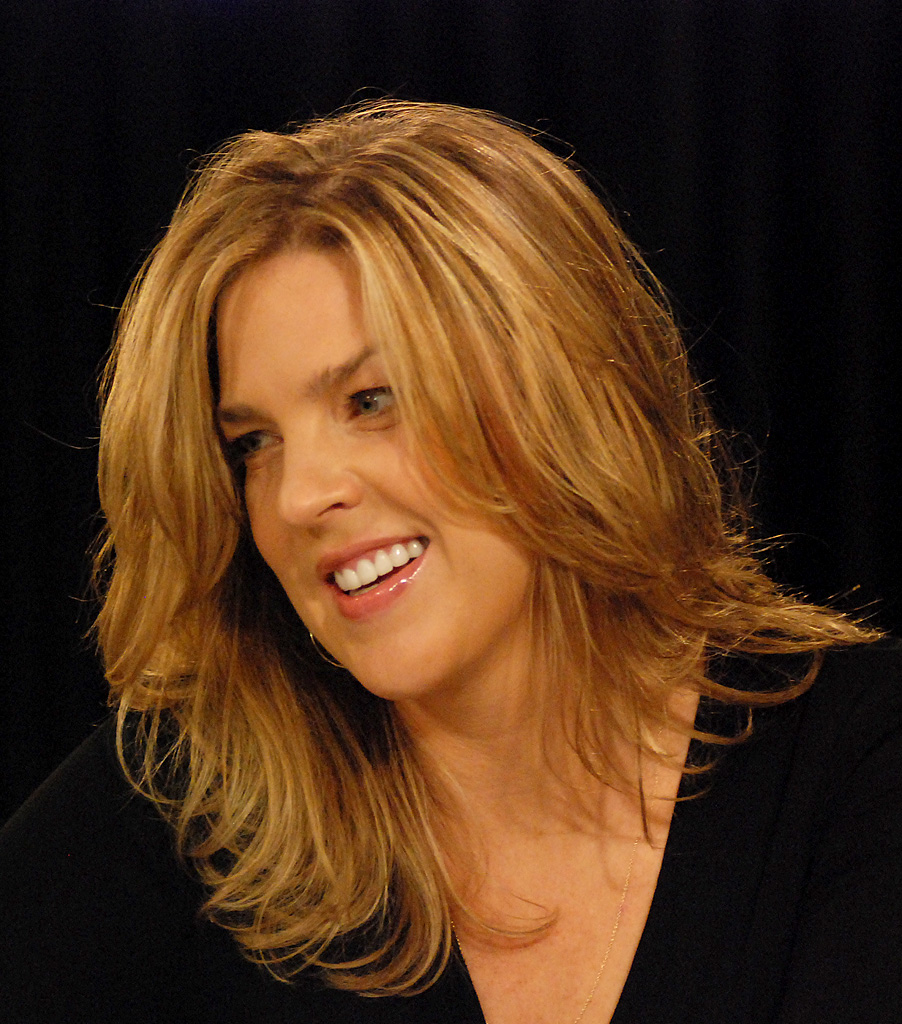
Diana Krall

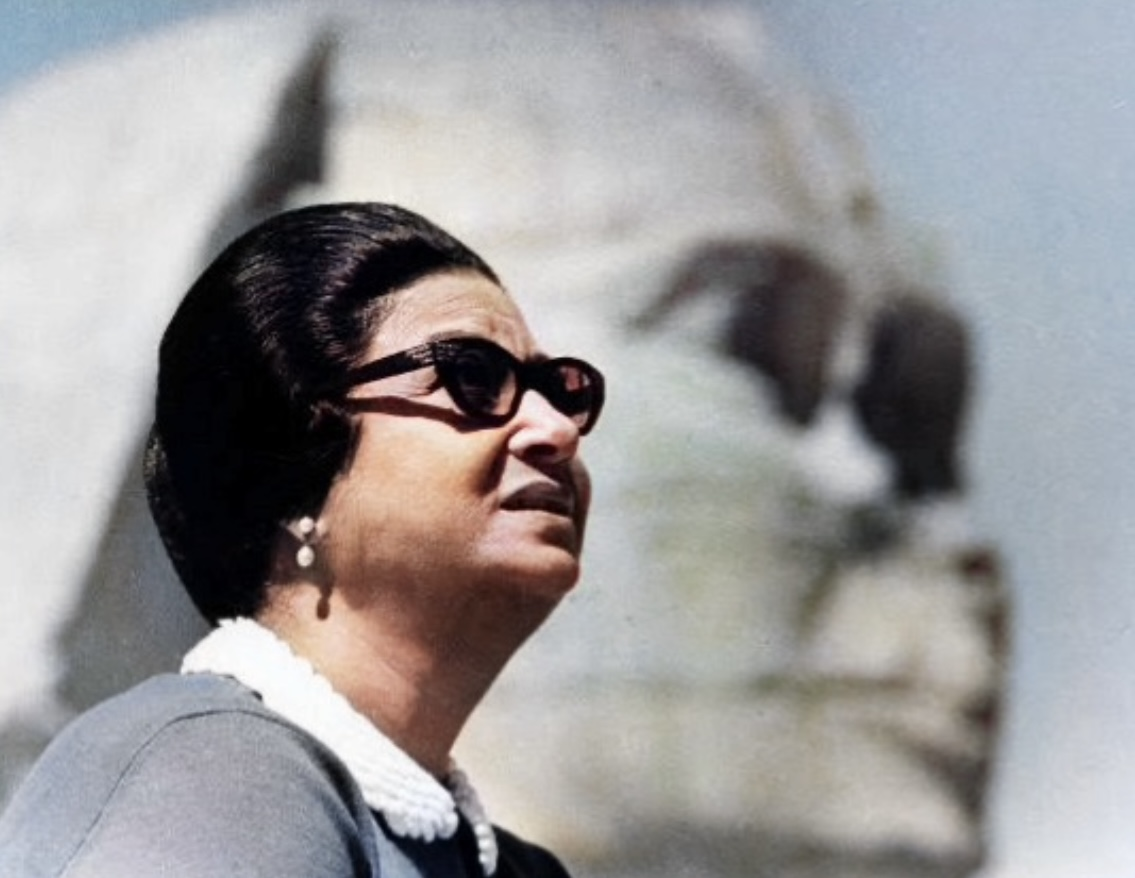
Umm Kulthum

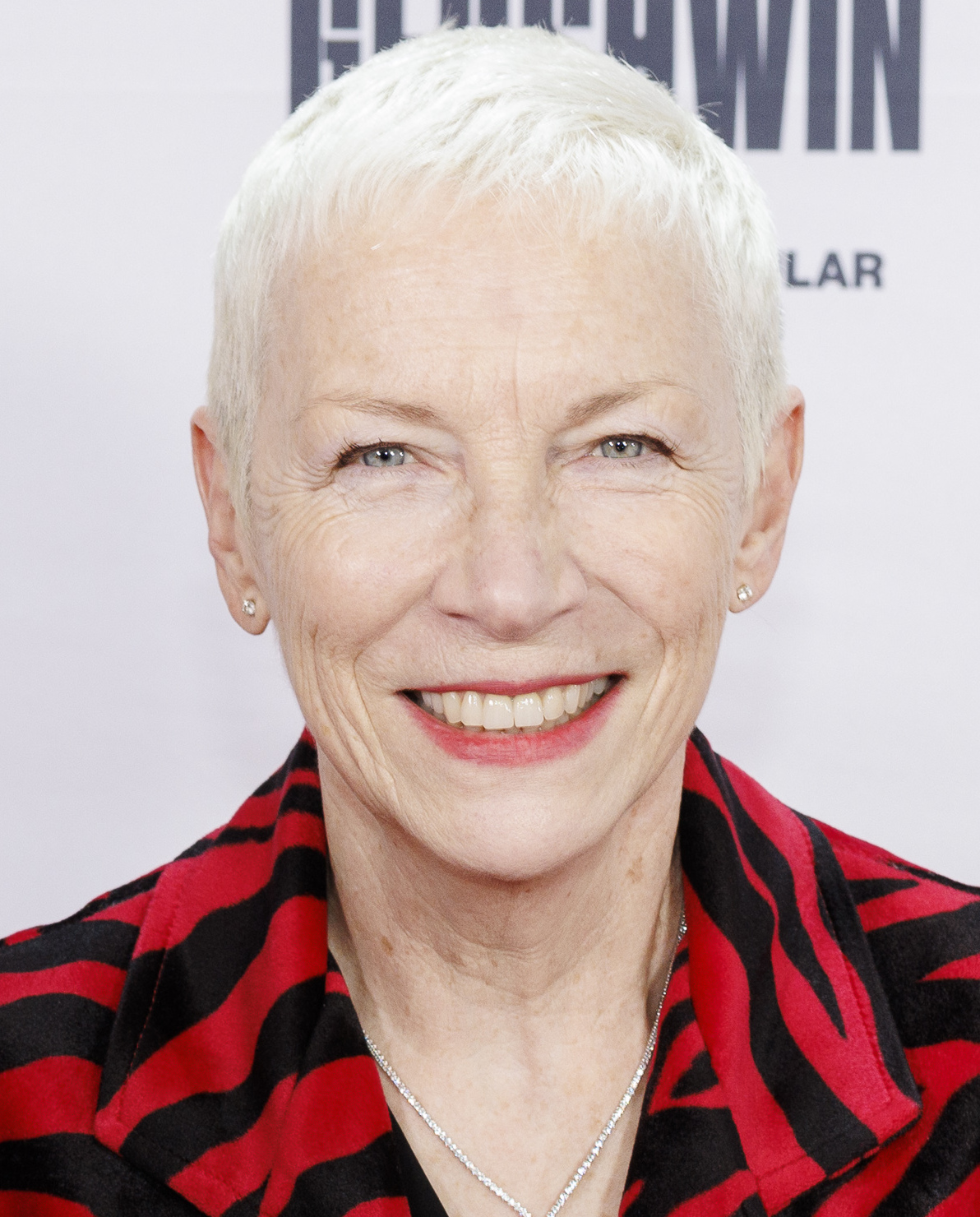
Annie Lennox

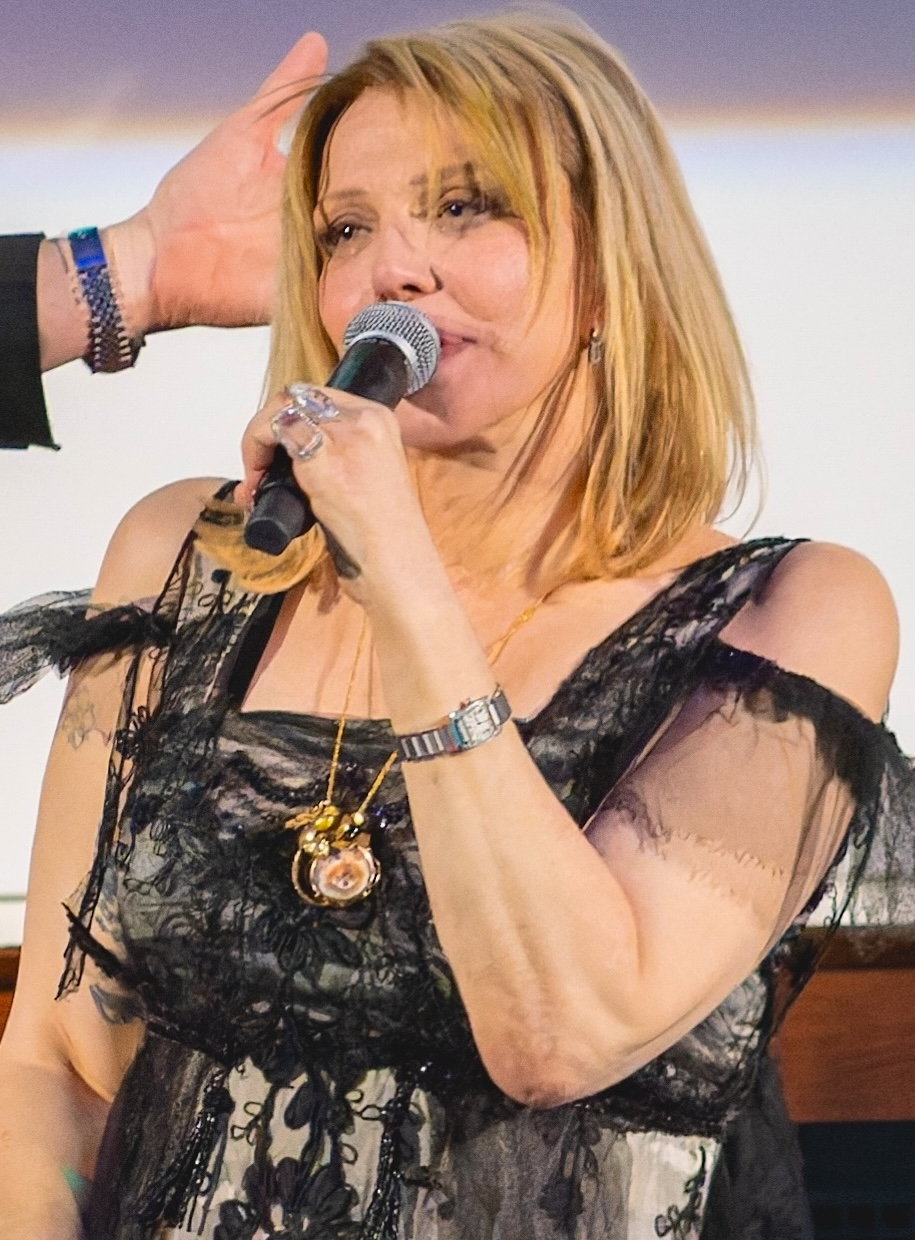
Courtney Love

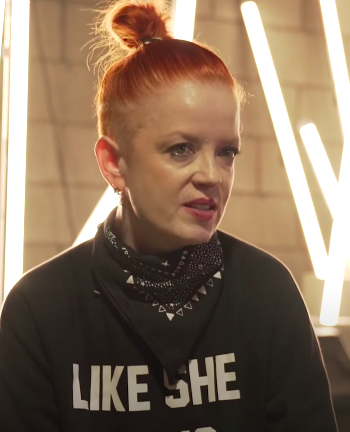
Shirley Manson

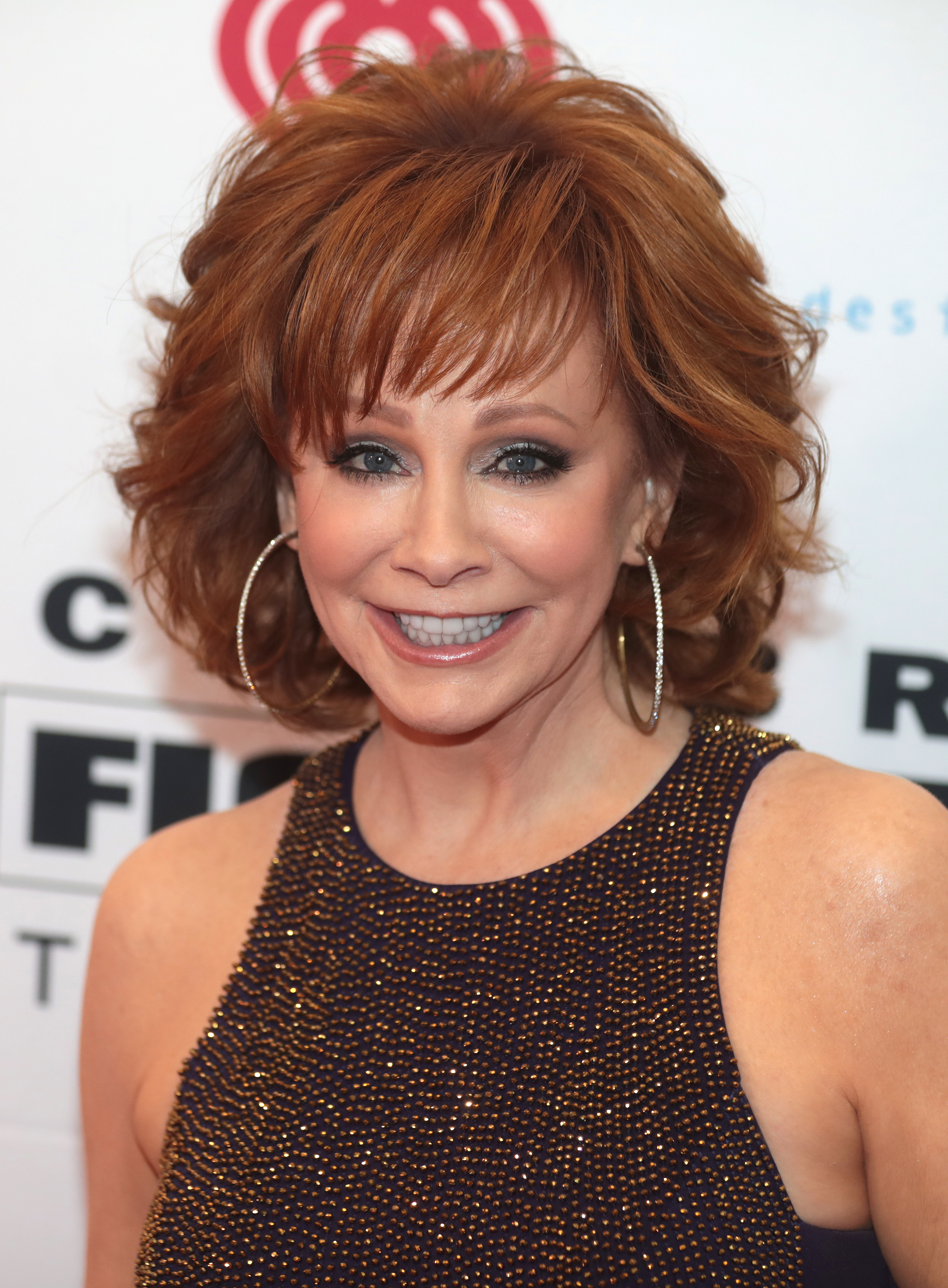
Reba McEntire

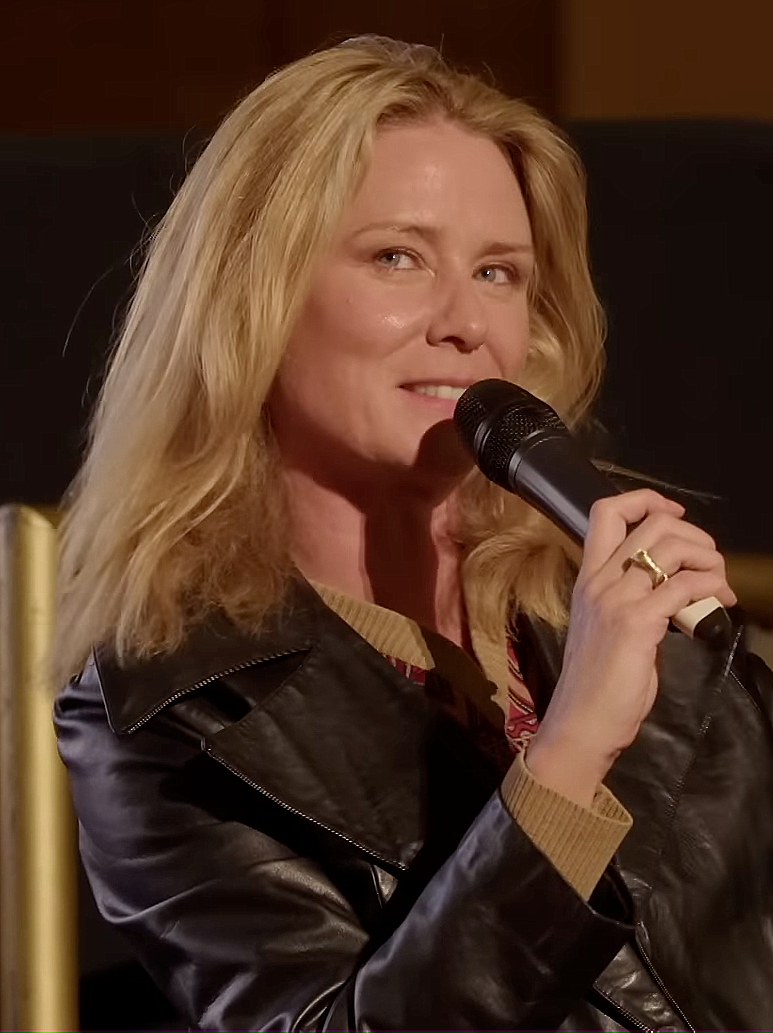
Róisín Murphy

Stevie Nicks

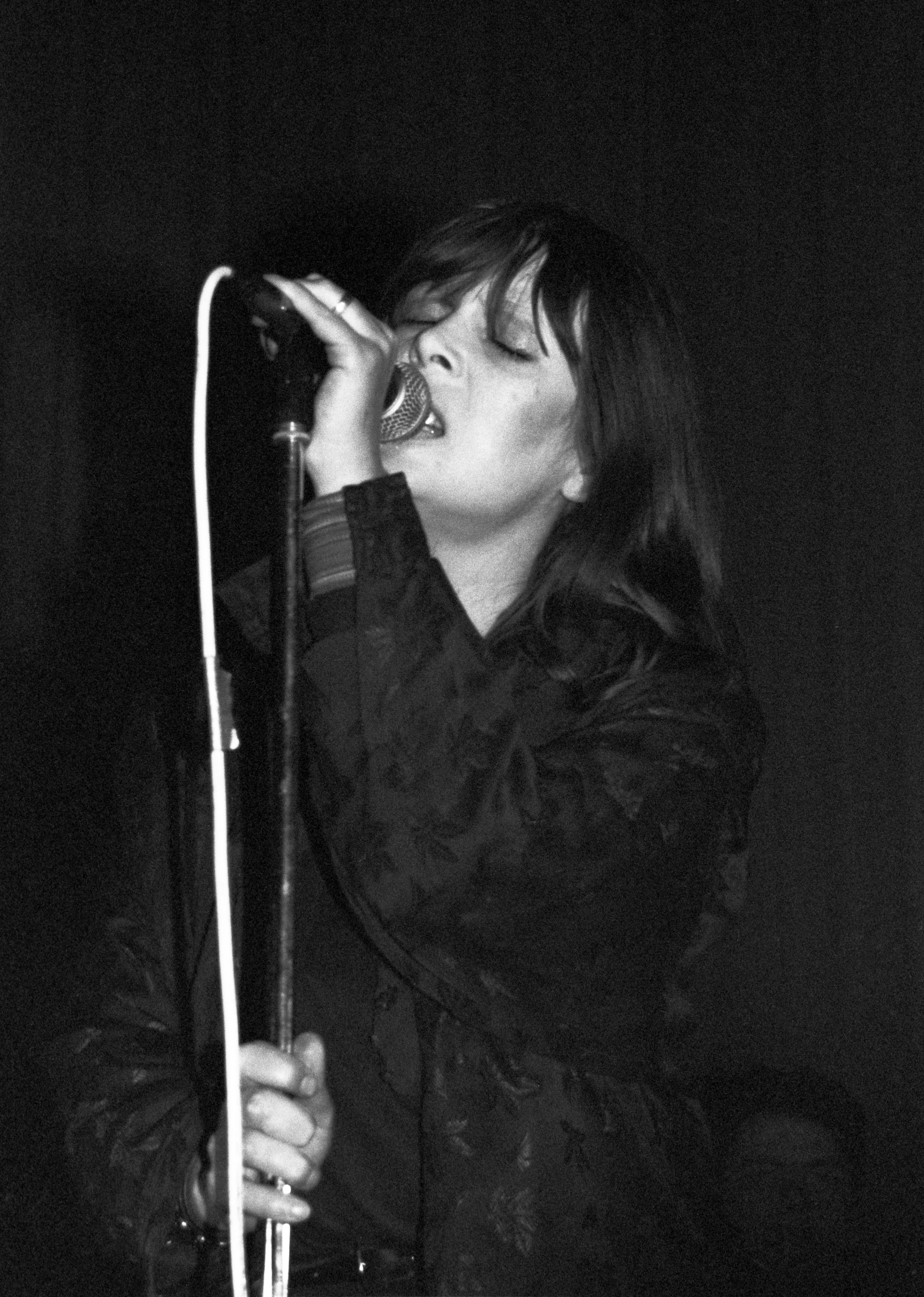
Nico

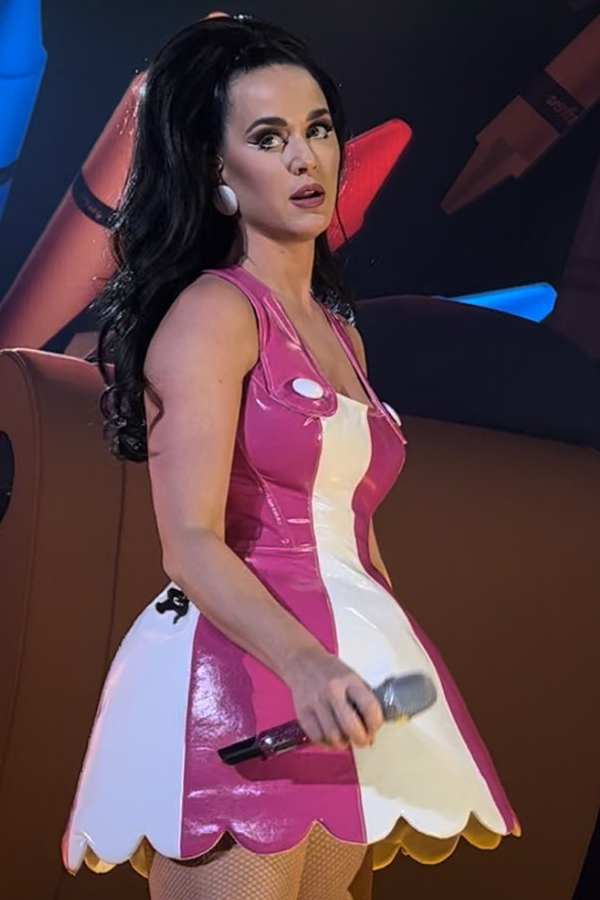
Katy Perry

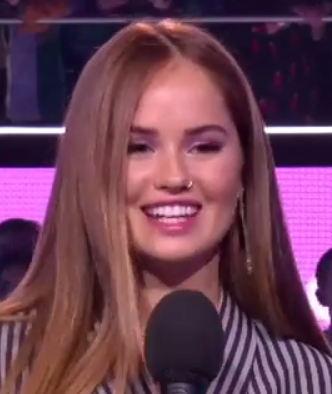
Debby Ryan

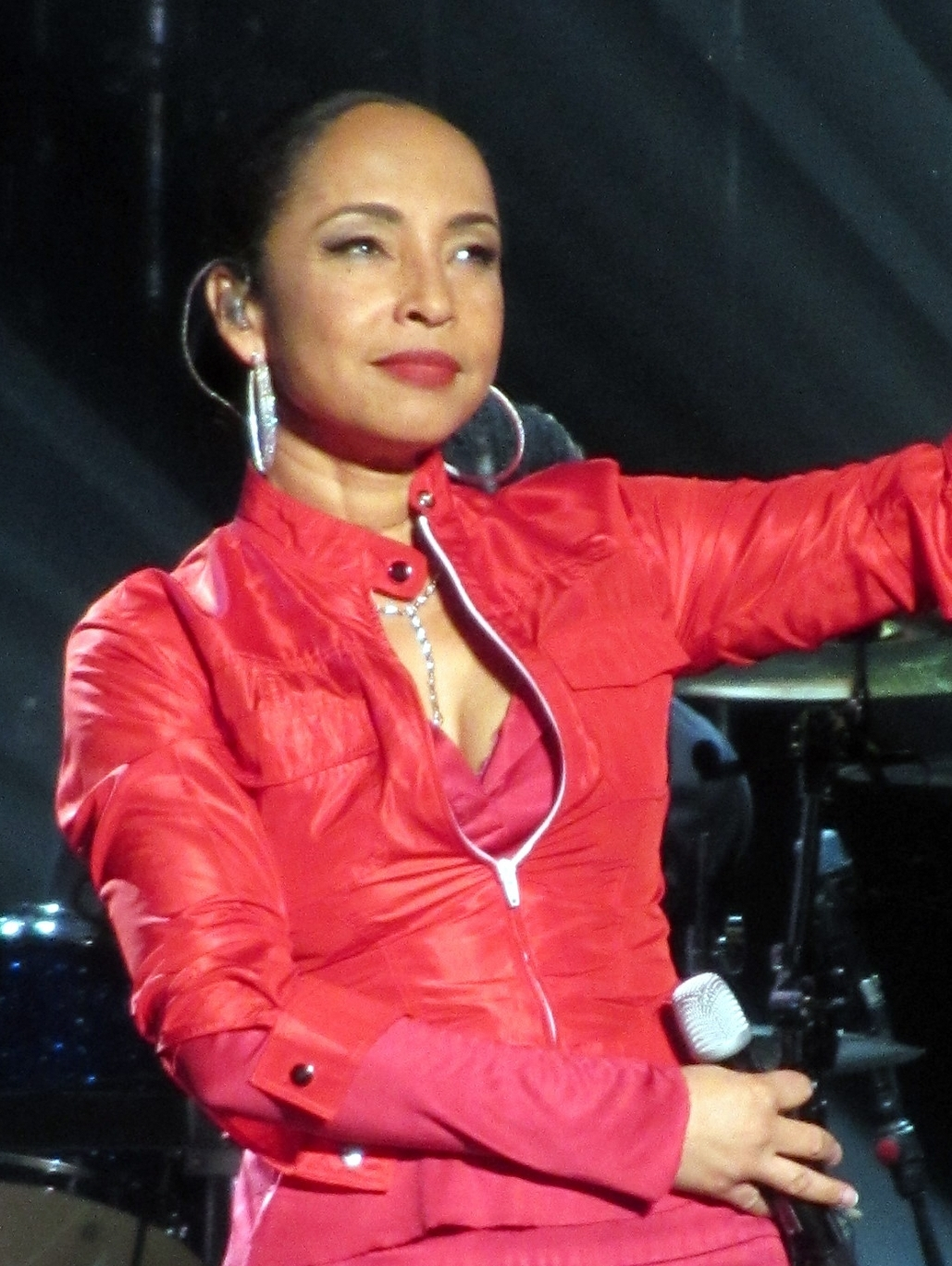
Sade

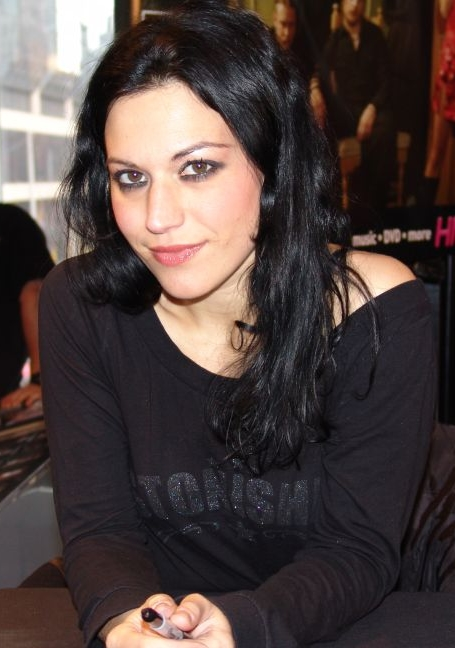
Cristina Scabbia

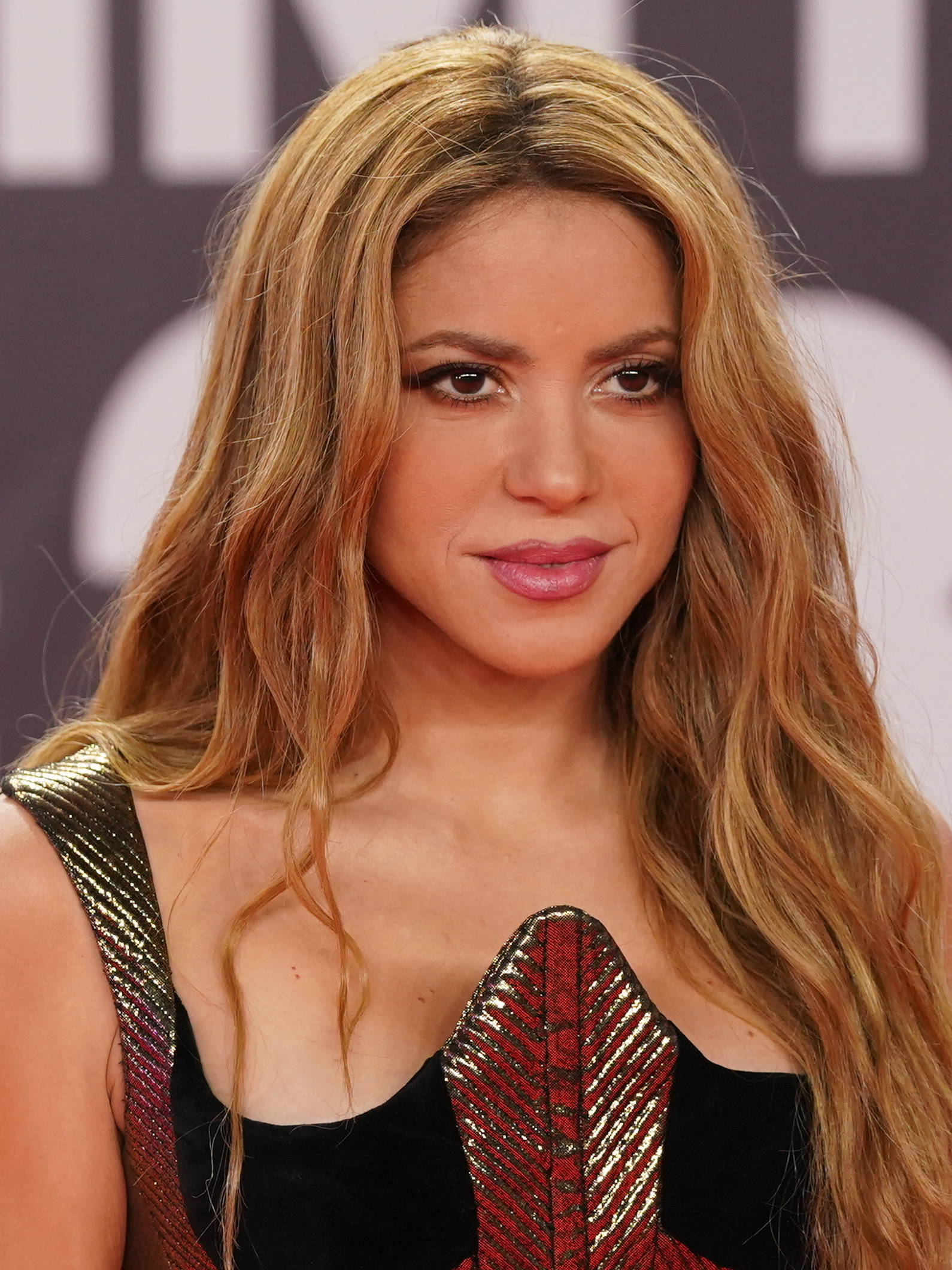
Shakira

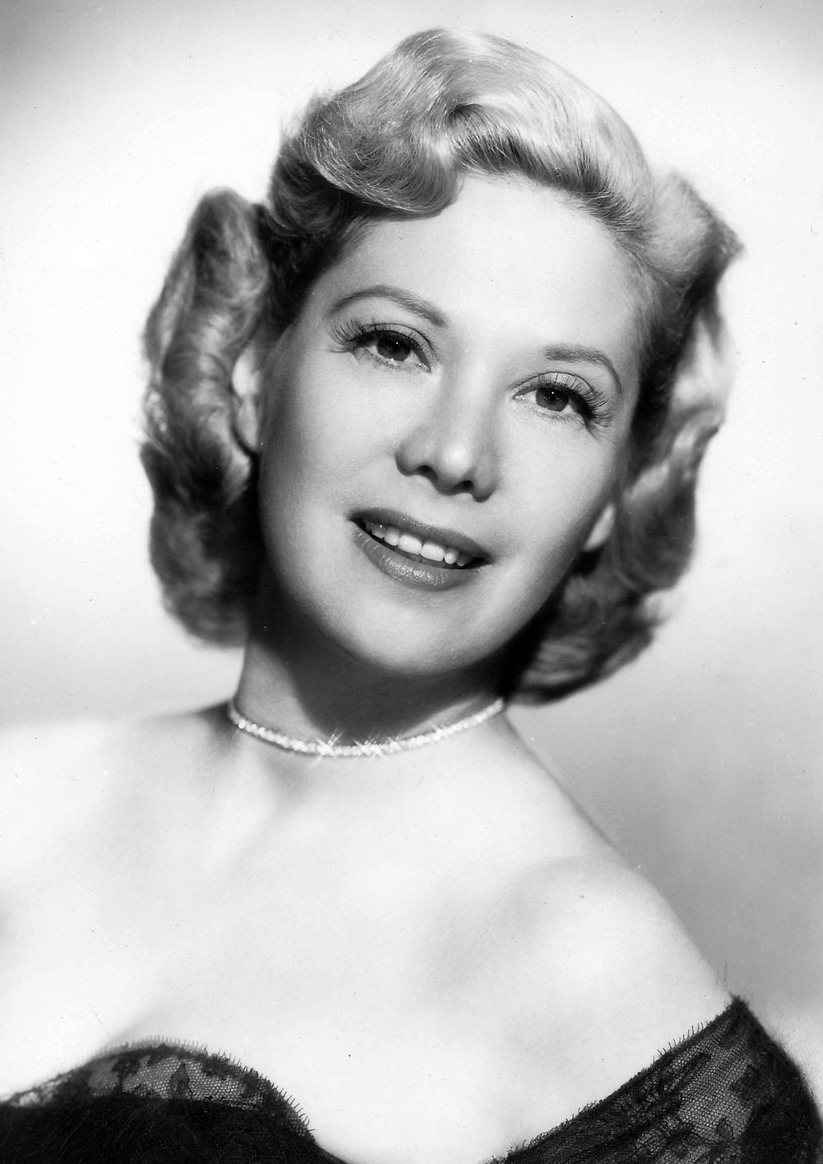
Dinah Shore

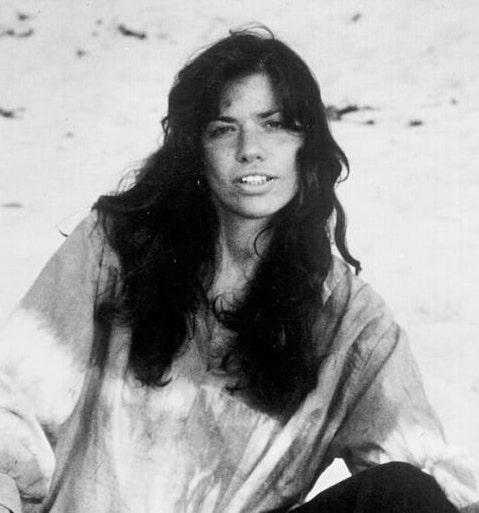
Carly Simon

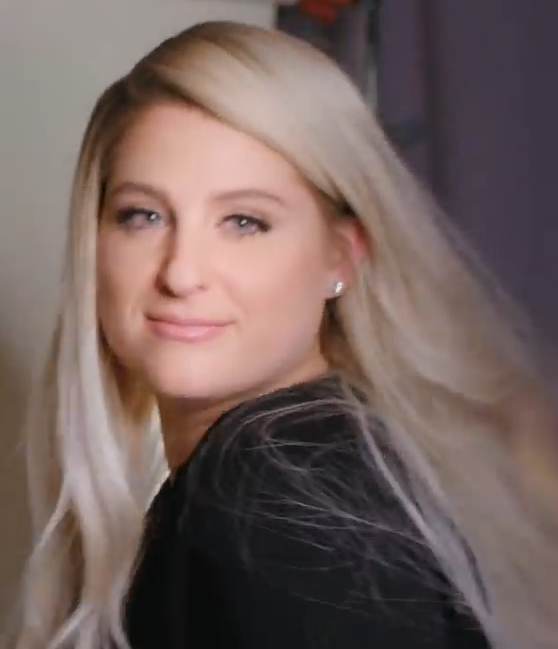
Meghan Trainor

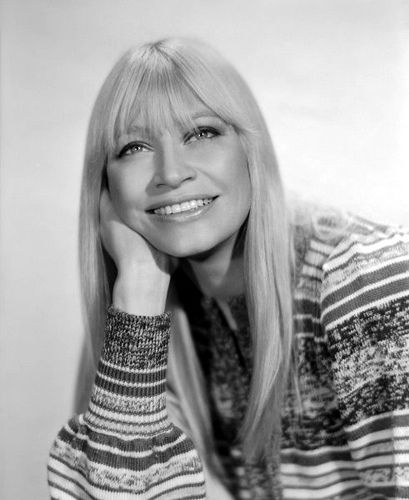
Mary Travers

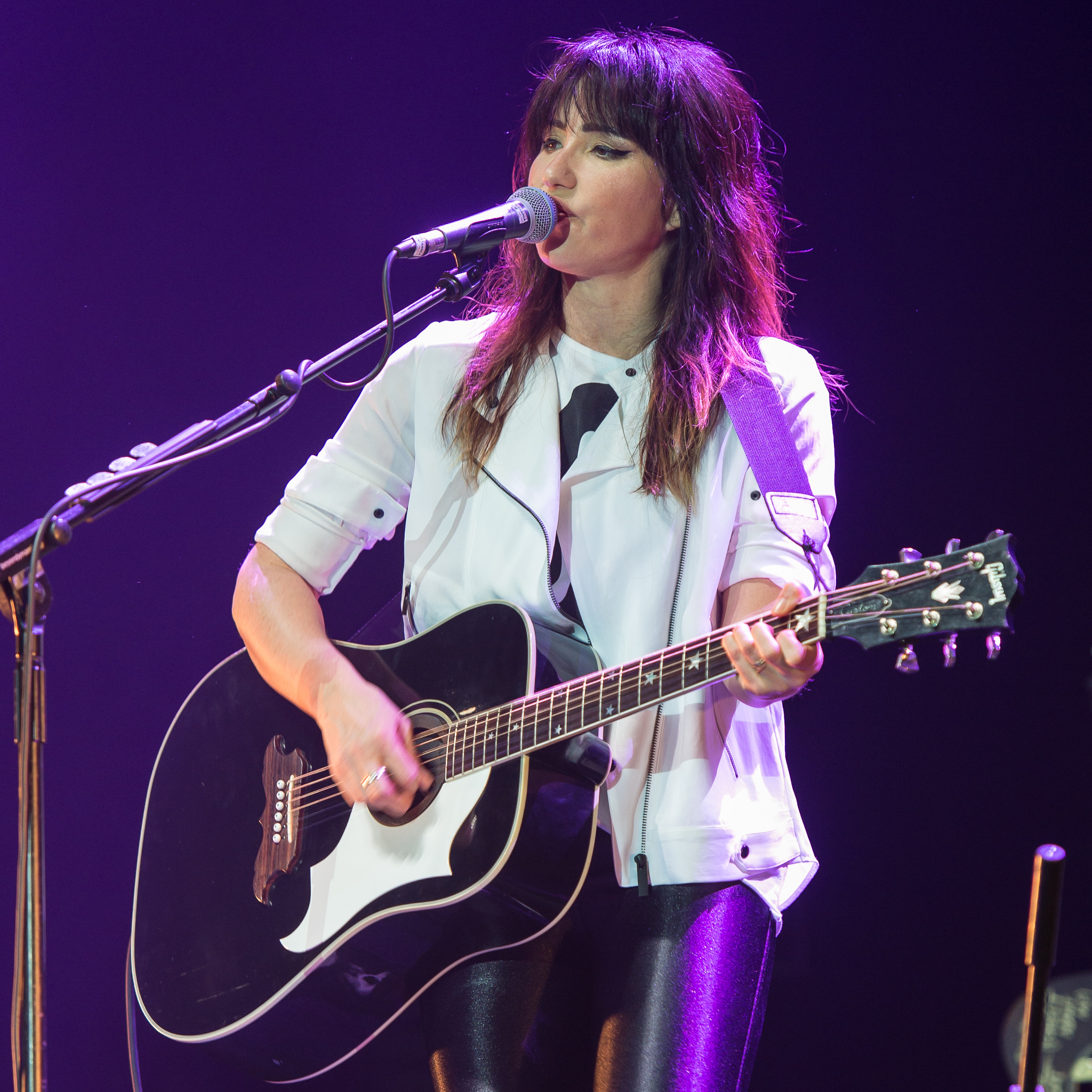
KT Tunstall

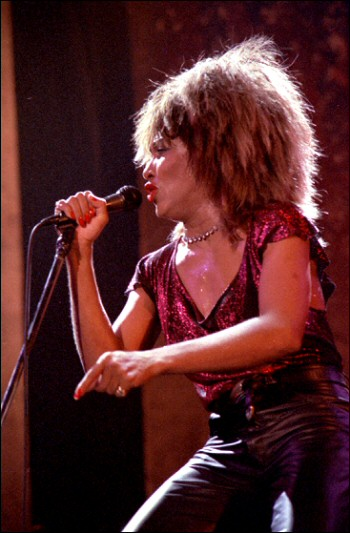
Tina Turner

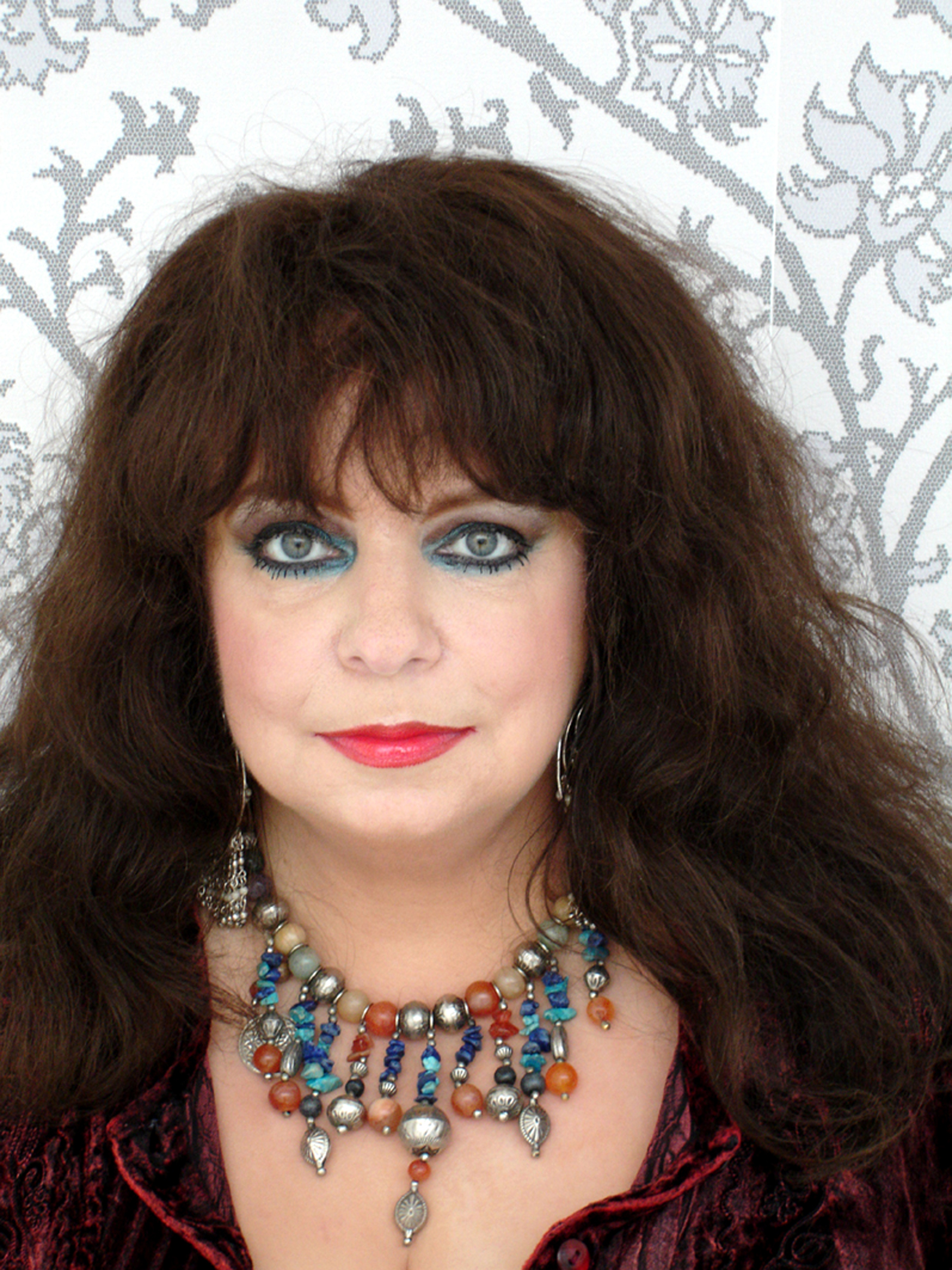
Mariska Veres

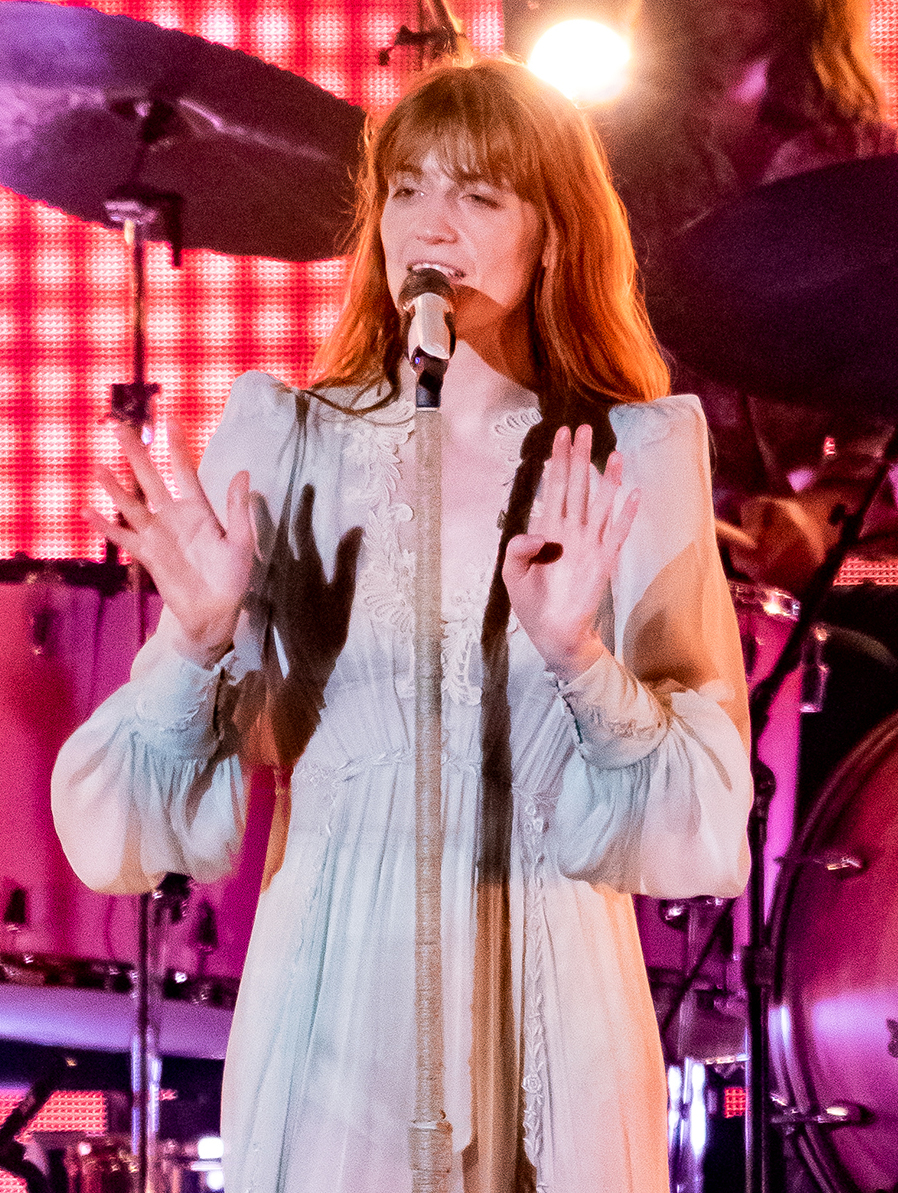
Florence Welch

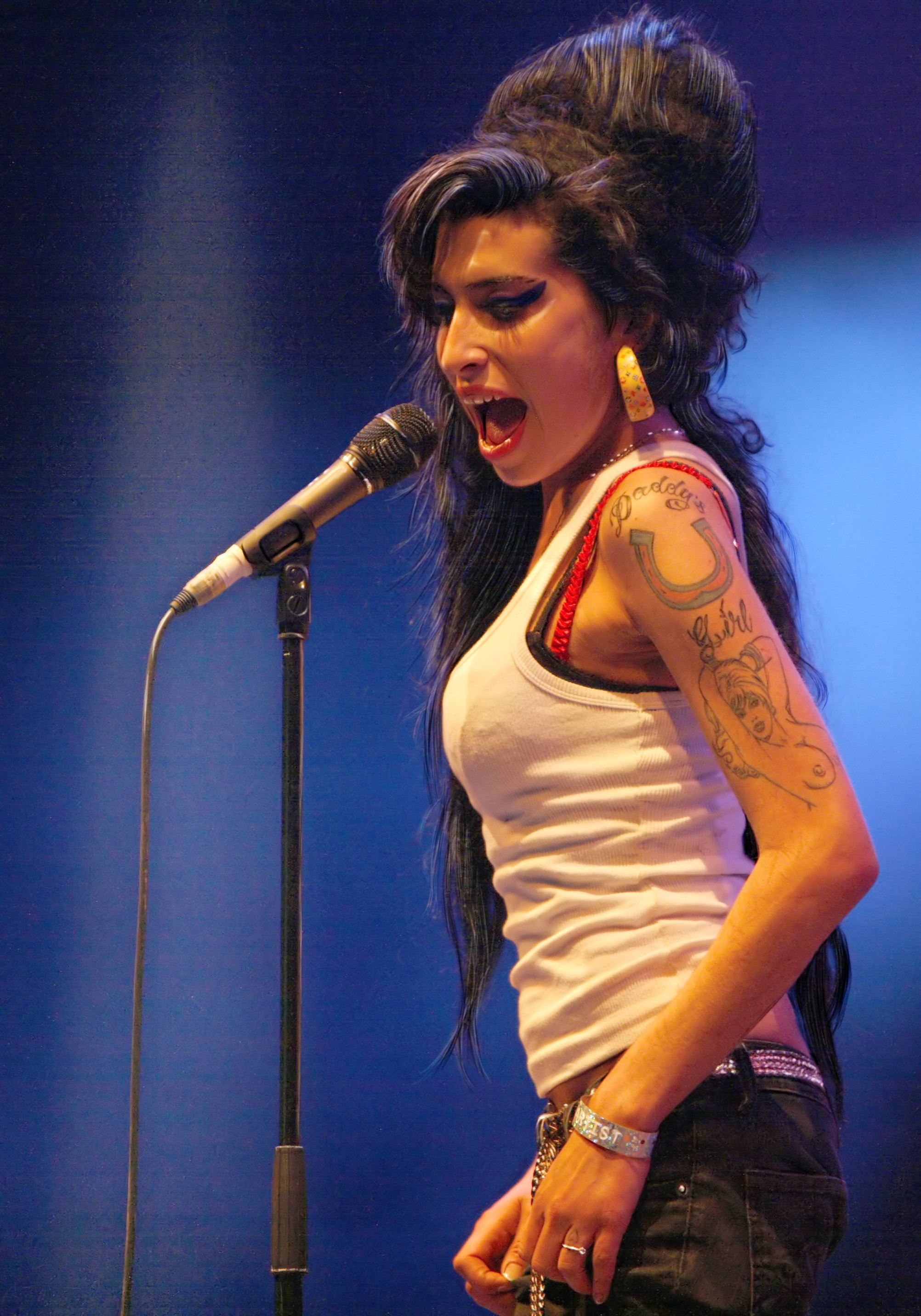
Amy Winehouse

Go to: A • B • C • D • E • F • G • H • J • K • L • M • N • O • P • Q • R • S • T • U • V • W • Y • Z

| Name | Lifespan | Nationality | Associated act(s) | Refs. |
|---|---|---|---|---|
| Abra | 1990– | American | | |
| Sade Adu | 1959– | Nigerian-British | Sade | |
| Arooj Aftab | 1985– | Pakistani-American | | |
| Dianna Agron (Note: Agron is also referred to as a soprano) | 1986– | American | Glee cast | |
| Karen Akers | 1945– | American | | |
| Nadia Ali | 1980– | American | iiO | |
| Yemi Alade | 1989– | Nigerian | | |
| Bobbie Allen | | American | | |
| Christina Amphlett | 1959–2013 | Australian | Divinyls | |
| Emma Anderson | 1967– | British | Lush | |
| Ernestine Anderson | 1928–2016 | American | | |
| Signe Anderson | 1941–2016 | American | Jefferson Airplane | |
| Inez Andrews | 1929–2012 | American | | |
| Anggun (Note: Other sources also refer to Anggun as a mezzo-soprano or a soprano) | 1974– | Indonesian | | |
| Diana Ankudinova | 2003– | Russian | | |
| Laurie Antonioli | 1958– | American | | |
| Fiona Apple | 1977– | American | | |
| India Arie | 1975– | American | | |
| Joan Armatrading | 1950– | British | | |
| Daymé Arocena | 1992– | Cuban | | |
| Emilie Autumn | 1979– | American | | |
| Nadezhda Babkina | 1950– | Russian | | |
| Nina Badrić | 1972– | Croatian | | |
| Anita Baker | 1958– | American | Chapter 8 | |
| LaVern Baker | 1929–1997 | American | | |
| Jill Barber | 1980– | Canadian | | |
| Courtney Barnett | 1987– | Australian | | |
| Stacy Barthe | 1985– | American | | |
| Shirley Bassey | 1937– | Welsh | | |
| Annette Beard | 1943– | American | Martha and the Vandellas | |
| Linn Berggren | 1970– | Swedish | Ace of Base | |
| Diane Birch | 1983– | American | | |
| Beverly Bivens | 1946– | American | We Five | |
| Emily Blunt | 1983– | British | | |
| Ann Boleyn | 1960– | American | | |
| Brandy | 1979– | American | | |
| Toni Braxton | 1967– | American | The Braxtons | |
| Ruth Brown | 1928–2006 | American | | |
| Carla Bruni | 1967– | Italian-French | | |
| Concha Buika | 1972– | Spanish | | |
| Alexandra Burke | 1988– | English | | |
| Julie Byrne | 1990– | American | | |
| Colbie Caillat | 1985– | American | Gone West | |
| Anna Calvi | 1980– | English | | |
| Caitlin Canty | 1982– | American | | |
| Alessia Cara | 1996– | Canadian | | |
| Brandi Carlile | 1981– | American | | |
| Ana Carolina | 1974– | Brazilian | | |
| Karen Carpenter | 1950–1983 | American | The Carpenters | |
| Mary Chapin Carpenter (Note: Carpenter is also referred to as a mezzo-soprano) | 1958– | American | | |
| Vikki Carr | 1940– | Mexican-American | | |
| Neko Case | 1970– | American | The New Pornographers | |
| Rosanne Cash | 1955– | American | | |
| Tracy Chapman | 1964– | American | | |
| Cher | 1946– | American | Sonny & Cher | |
| Neneh Cherry | 1964– | Swedish | The Slits; Rip Rig + Panic; CirKus; New Age Steppers | |
| Julie Christmas | 1975– | American | Made Out of Babies; Battle of Mice | |
| Gabriella Cilmi | 1991– | Australian | | |
| Charmaine Clamor | | Filipino | | |
| Emilia Clarke | 1986– | English | | |
| Patsy Cline | 1932–1963 | American | | |
| Rosemary Clooney | 1928–2002 | American | | |
| Dorothy Love Coates | 1928–2002 | American | | |
| Alexis Cole | 1976– | American | | |
| Shawn Colvin (Note: Some sources also refer to Colvin as a soprano) | 1956– | American | | |
| Rita Coolidge | 1945- | American | | |
| Charlotte Cornfield | 1988/1989– | Canadian | | |
| Bethany Cosentino | 1986– | American | Best Coast | |
| Latice Crawford | 1982– | American | | |
| Celia Cruz | 1925–2003 | Cuban | Sonora Matancera; Fania All-Stars | |
| Sharon Cuneta | 1966– | Filipino | | |
| Lucy Dacus (Note: Dacus is also referred to as a mezzo-soprano) | 1995– | American | Boygenius | |
| Lauren Daigle | 1991– | American | North Point Worship | |
| Brody Dalle | 1979– | Australian | The Distillers; Spinnerette | |
| Jessica Darrow | 1995– | Cuban-American | | |
| Andra Day | 1984– | American | | |
| Doris Day | 1922–2019 | American | | |
| Kim Deal | 1961– | American | The Breeders; Pixies | |
| Olivia Dean | 1999– | British | | |
| Lana Del Rey | 1985– | American | | |
| Brigitte DeMeyer | | American | | |
| Kristin Diable | 1986/1987– | American | | |
| Marlene Dietrich | 1901–1992 | German | | |
| Ani DiFranco | 1970– | American | | |
| Stefflon Don | 1991– | British | | |
| Lila Downs (Note: Downs is also referred to as a mezzo-soprano) | 1968– | Mexican | | |
| Corinne Drewery | 1959– | English | Swing Out Sister | |
| Andrea Echeverri | 1965– | Colombian | Aterciopelados | |
| Ana Egge | 1976– | Canadian-American | | |
| Eliane Elias | 1960– | Brazilian | Steps Ahead | |
| Cass Elliot | 1941–1974 | American | The Mamas and the Papas | |
| Missy Elliott | 1971– | American | Sista; Swing Mob | |
| Noga Erez | 1989– | Israeli | | |
| Gloria Estefan | 1957– | Cuban-American | Miami Sound Machine | |
| Bridget Everett | 1972– | American | | |
| Cesária Évora | 1941–2011 | Cape Verdean | Bau | |
| Siobhan Fahey | 1958– | Irish | Bananarama; Shakespears Sister | |
| Mary Fahl | 1958– | American | October Project | |
| Maria Farantouri | 1947– | Greek | | |
| Alice Faye | 1915–1998 | American | | |
| Ruth Fernández | 1919–2012 | Puerto Rican | | |
| Sky Ferreira | 1992– | American | | |
| Melanie Fiona | 1983– | Canadian | X-Quisite | |
| Carrie Fisher | 1956–2016 | American | | |
| Roberta Flack | 1937–2025 | American | | |
| Mary Ford | 1924–1977 | American | Les Paul and Mary Ford | |
| Julia Fordham | 1962– | English | | |
| Anne Francine | 1917–1999 | American | | |
| Stacy Francis | 1979– | American | Ex Girlfriend | |
| Jane Froman | 1907–1980 | American | | |
| Shannon Funchess | 1971/1972– | American | Light Asylum | |
| Lady Gaga (Note: Some sources also refer to Lady Gaga as a mezzo-soprano) | 1986– | American | | |
| Roberta Gambarini | 1972– | Italian | | |
| Merrill Garbus | 1979– | American | Tune-Yards | |
| Judy Garland (Note: Some sources also refer to Garland as a mezzo-soprano) | 1922–1969 | American | | |
| Sara Gazarek | 1982– | American | | |
| Bobbie Gentry | 1942– | American | | |
| Lisa Gerrard | 1961– | Australian | Dead Can Dance | |
| Beth Gibbons | 1965– | British | Portishead | |
| Ronnie Gilbert | 1926–2015 | American | The Weavers | |
| Alice Glass | 1988– | Canadian | Crystal Castles | |
| Jess Glynne (Note: Glynne is also referred to as a mezzo-soprano) | 1989– | English | | |
| Kim Gordon | 1953– | American | Sonic Youth; Body/Head | |
| Macy Gray | 1967– | American | | |
| Grenique | 1975– | American | | |
| Alejandra Guzman | 1968– | Mexican | | |
| Danielle Haim | 1989– | American | Haim | |
| Toni Halliday | 1964– | British | Curve | |
| Rosalie "Rosie" Hamlin | 1945–2017 | American | Rosie and the Originals | |
| Ann Harada | 1964– | American | | |
| Aldous Harding | 1990– | New Zealand | | |
| Jessica Harp | 1982– | American | The Wreckers | |
| Beth Hart | 1972– | American | | |
| Polly Jean "PJ" Harvey | 1969– | British | The Desert Sessions | |
| Lalah Hathaway | 1968– | American | | |
| Nona Hendryx | 1944– | American | Labelle | |
| Gwyneth Herbert | 1981– | British | | |
| Jessica Hernandez | 1987– | American | Jessica Hernandez & the Deltas | |
| Faith Hill | 1967– | American | | |
| Lauryn Hill | 1975– | American | Fugees | |
| Alison Hinds | 1970– | Barbadian | Square One | |
| Billie Holiday | 1915–1959 | American | | |
| Julia Holter | 1984– | American | | |
| Lena Horne | 1917–2010 | American | | |
| Nicole Hummel | 1989– | American | Zola Jesus | |
| Jana Hunter | | American | Lower Dens | |
| Phyllis Hyman | 1949–1995 | American | | |
| Chrissie Hynde | 1951– | American | The Pretenders | |
| Markéta Irglová | 1988– | Czech | The Swell Season | |
| Mahalia Jackson | 1911–1972 | American | | |
| Wanda Jackson | 1937– | American | | |
| Etta James | 1938–2012 | American | | |
| Sarah Jarosz (Note: Jarosz is also referred to as a soprano) | 1991– | American | I'm with Her | |
| Scarlett Johansson | 1984– | American | | |
| Le'Andria Johnson | 1983– | American | | |
| Tamara Johnson-George | 1971– | American | SWV | |
| Ada Jones | 1873–1922 | English-American | | |
| Grace Jones | 1948– | Jamaican | | |
| Norah Jones | 1979– | American | The Little Willies; Puss n Boots | |
| Samara Joy | 1999– | American | | |
| Wynonna Judd | 1964– | American | The Judds | |
| Barb Jungr | 1954– | British | | |
| Patricia Kaas | 1966– | French | | |
| Trish Keenan (Note: Some sources also refer to Keenan as a soprano) | 1968–2011 | British | Broadcast | |
| Alicia Keys | 1981– | American | | |
| Chaka Khan | 1953– | American | Rufus | |
| Carole King | 1942– | American | | |
| Morgana King | 1930–2018 | American | | |
| Gladys Knight | 1944– | American | Gladys Knight & the Pips | |
| Kandia Kouyaté | 1959– | Malian | | |
| Diana Krall | 1964– | Canadian | | |
| Umm Kulthum | 1904–1975 | Egyptian | | |
| Grace Lynn Kung | 1987– | Canadian | | |
| Dayna Kurtz | | American | | |
| Ladyhawke | 1979– | New Zealand | Two Lane Blacktop; Teenager | |
| Queen Latifah | 1970– | American | Flavor Unit; Native Tongues | |
| Laufey | 1999– | Icelandic | | |
| Bettye LaVette | 1946– | American | | |
| Q Lazzarus | 1960–2022 | American | | |
| Amanda Lear | 1939 or 1941 or 1946 or 1950– | French | | |
| Maysa Leak | 1966– | American | Incognito | |
| Peggy Lee | 1920–2002 | American | | |
| Victoria Legrand | 1981– | French-American | Beach House | |
| Marie-Nicole Lemieux | 1975– | Canadian | | |
| Annie Lennox | 1954– | Scottish | The Tourists; Eurythmics | |
| Jenny Lewis (Note: Some sources also refer to Lewis as a soprano) | 1976– | American | Rilo Kiley | |
| Lhasa | 1972–2010 | American-Canadian | | |
| Lotta "Léon" Lindgren | 1993– | Swedish | | |
| Julie London | 1926–2000 | American | | |
| Courtney Love | 1964– | American | Hole | |
| Khánh Ly | 1945– | Vietnamese-American | | |
| Shelby Lynne | 1968– | American | | |
| Amy Macdonald | 1987– | Scottish | | |
| Romy Madley Croft | 1989– | English | The xx | |
| Audra Mae | 1984– | American | | |
| Clare Maguire | 1988– | British | | |
| Shirley Manson | 1966– | Scottish | Garbage; Angelfish; Goodbye Mr Mackenzie | |
| Mavie Marcos | 1978– | Papuan-American | Andain | |
| Teairra Marí | 1987– | American | | |
| Mariza | 1973– | Portuguese | | |
| Laura Marling | 1990– | British | Noah and the Whale | |
| Chan Marshall | 1972– | American | Cat Power | |
| Dorothy Martin | 1986– | American | Dorothy | |
| Heather Masse | | American | The Wailin' Jennys | |
| Mattiel | | American | | |
| Elisabeth "Lissie" Maurus (Note: Maurus is also referred to as a mezzo-soprano) | 1982– | American | | |
| Imelda May | 1974– | Irish | | |
| Andrea McArdle | 1963– | American | | |
| Gwen McCrae | 1943–2025 | American | | |
| Earl-Jean McCrea | 1942– | American | The Cookies | |
| Anne McCue | | American | | |
| Jenna McDougall | 1992– | Australian | Tonight Alive | |
| Reba McEntire | 1955– | American | | |
| Lori McKenna | 1968– | American | | |
| Éabha McMahon | 1990– | Irish | Celtic Woman | |
| Shannon McNally | 1973– | American | | |
| Katharine McPhee | 1984– | American | | |
| Carmen McRae | 1922–1994 | American | | |
| Christine McVie | 1943–2022 | British | Fleetwood Mac | |
| Natalie Merchant | 1963– | American | 10,000 Maniacs | |
| Natalie Mering | 1988– | American | Weyes Blood | |
| Sophie Milman | 1983– | Russian | | |
| Nicki Minaj | 1982– | Trinidadian | | |
| Joni Mitchell (Note: Some sources also refer to Mitchell as a soprano and a mezzo-soprano) | 1943– | Canadian | | |
| Mitski | 1990- | American | | |
| Moonbyul | 1992– | South Korean | Mamamoo; Mamamoo+ | |
| Pamela Morgan | 1957– | Canadian | Figgy Duff | |
| Maren Morris | 1990– | American | The Highwomen | |
| Sarah Jane Morris | 1959– | English | | |
| Alison Mosshart | 1978– | American | The Kills; The Dead Weather; Discount | |
| Ana Moura | 1979– | Portuguese | | |
| Alison Moyet | 1961– | English | Yazoo; The Screamin' Ab Dabs; The Vandals | |
| Anita Mui | 1963–2003 | Hong Kong | | |
| Samantha Mumba | 1983– | Irish | | |
| Róisín Murphy | 1973– | Irish | Moloko | |
| Anne Murray | 1945– | Canadian | | |
| Akina Nakamori | 1965– | Japanese | | |
| Johnette Napolitano | 1957– | American | Concrete Blonde | |
| N'Dambi | 1970– | American | | |
| Meshell Ndegeocello | 1968– | German-American | | |
| Jennifer Nettles | 1974– | American | Sugarland | |
| Scout Niblett | 1973– | British | | |
| Stevie Nicks | 1948– | American | Fleetwood Mac | |
| Nico | 1938–1988 | German | The Velvet Underground | |
| Molly Nilsson | 1984/1985– | Swedish | | |
| Anita O'Day | 1919–2006 | American | | |
| Agnes Obel | 1980– | Danish | | |
| Odetta | 1930–2008 | American | | |
| Angel Olsen | 1987– | American | | |
| Susan O'Neill | 1990– | Irish | | |
| Jessica Origliasso | 1984– | Australian | The Veronicas | |
| Beth Orton | 1970– | English | | |
| Patti Page | 1927–2013 | American | | |
| Amanda Palmer | 1976– | American | The Dresden Dolls; Evelyn Evelyn; 8in8; Grand Theft Orchestra | |
| Gigi Perez | 2000– | American | | |
| Katy Perry | 1984– | American | | |
| Madeleine Peyroux | 1974– | American | The Lost Wandering Blues and Jazz Band | |
| Liz Phair | 1967– | American | | |
| Pink | 1979– | American | You+Me; Choice; Basic Instinct | |
| Ruth Pointer | 1946– | American | The Pointer Sisters | |
| Omara Portuondo | 1930– | Cuban | | |
| Patty Pravo | 1948– | Italian | | |
| Kelly Price | 1973– | American | | |
| Rachael Price | 1985– | Australian-American | Lake Street Dive | |
| Lauren Pritchard | 1987– | American | | |
| Titiek Puspa | 1937–2025 | Indonesian | | |
| Ivy Queen | 1972– | Puerto Rican | | |
| Ma Rainey | 1886–1939 | American | The Rabbit's Foot Company | |
| Zoë Randell | | Australian | Luluc | |
| Lynda Randle | 1962– | American | | |
| Dianne Reeves | 1956– | American | | |
| Martha Reeves | 1941– | American | Martha and the Vandellas; The Fascinations | |
| Ellen Reid | 1966– | Canadian | Crash Test Dummies | |
| Hannah Reid | 1989– | English | London Grammar | |
| Debbie Reynolds | 1932–2016 | American | | |
| Happy Rhodes (Note: Rhodes is also referred to as a soprano) | 1965– | American | | |
| Kim Richey | 1956– | American | | |
| LaTavia Roberson | 1981– | American | Destiny's Child | |
| Sharon Robinson | 1958– | American | | |
| Maggie Roche | 1951–2017 | American | The Roches | |
| Jasmine Rodgers | 1976– | English | Bôa | |
| Baby Rose | 1994– | American | | |
| Rumer | 1979– | British | | |
| Lidia Ruslanova | 1900–1973 | Russian/Soviet | | |
| Debby Ryan | 1993– | American | The Never Ending | |
| Lætitia Sadier | 1968– | French | Stereolab; Monade; McCarthy | |
| Melanie Safka | 1947– 2024 | American | | |
| Aicelle Santos | 1985– | Filipino | La Diva | |
| Cristina Scabbia | 1972– | Italian | Lacuna Coil; Rezophonic | |
| Hillary Scott | 1986– | American | Lady A | |
| Mackenzie Scott | 1991– | American | Julien Baker & Torres | |
| Alynda Segarra | 1986 or 1987– | American | Hurray for the Riff Raff | |
| Shakira | 1977– | Colombian | | |
| Helen Shapiro | 1946– | British | | |
| Ashton Shepherd | 1986– | American | | |
| Fatin Shidqia | 1996– | Indonesian | | |
| Dinah Shore | 1917–1994 | American | | |
| Jane Siberry (Note: Some sources also refer to Siberry as a soprano) | 1955– | Canadian | | |
| Janis Siegel | 1952– | American | The Manhattan Transfer | |
| Carly Simon | 1945– | American | The Simon Sisters; Elephant's Memory | |
| Nina Simone | 1933–2003 | American | | |
| Nancy Sinatra | 1940– | American | | |
| Siouxsie Sioux | 1957– | English | Siouxsie and the Banshees; The Creatures | |
| Bria Skonberg | 1983– | Canadian | | |
| Grace Slick | 1939– | American | Jefferson Airplane; Jefferson Starship; Starship; Great Society | |
| Carol Sloane | 1937–2023 | American | | |
| Bessie Smith | 1894–1937 | American | | |
| Kate Smith (Note: Some sources also refer to Smith as a mezzo-soprano) | 1907–1986 | American | | |
| Keely Smith | 1928–2017 | American | | |
| Mamie Smith | 1891–1946 | American | | |
| Patti Smith | 1946– | American | Patti Smith Group | |
| Carly Smithson | 1983– | Irish | We Are the Fallen | |
| Phoebe Snow | 1950–2011 | American | Sisters of Glory | |
| Mercedes Sosa | 1935–2009 | Argentine | | |
| Tessa Souter | 1956– | English | | |
| Sharleen Spiteri | 1967– | Scottish | Texas | |
| Kandace Springs | 1989– | American | | |
| Mary Stallings | 1939– | American | | |
| Lisa Stansfield | 1966– | British | Blue Zone | |
| Mavis Staples | 1939– | American | The Staple Singers | |
| Star Anna | 1985– | American | Star Anna and the Laughing Dogs | |
| Lennon Stella | 1999– | Canadian | Lennon & Maisy | |
| Joss Stone | 1987– | British | SuperHeavy | |
| Jazmine Sullivan | 1987– | American | | |
| Tierney Sutton | 1963– | American | | |
| SZA | 1989– or 1990– | American | | |
| Teyana Taylor | 1990– or 1991– | American | | |
| Zola Taylor | 1938–2007 | American | The Platters | |
| Susan Tedeschi | 1970– | American | Tedeschi Trucks Band | |
| Toni Tennille | 1940– | American | Captain & Tennille | |
| Tracey Thorn | 1962– | English | Everything but the Girl; Marine Girls | |
| Teri Thornton | 1934–2000 | American | | |
| Lệ Thu | 1943–2021 | Vietnamese | | |
| Tanita Tikaram | 1969– | German-British | | |
| Mary Timony | 1970– | American | Helium; Autoclave; Wild Flag; Ex Hex | |
| Meghan Trainor | 1993– | American | | |
| Mary Travers | 1936–2009 | American | Peter, Paul and Mary | |
| Gloria Trevi | 1968– | Mexican | | |
| Tanya Tucker | 1958– | American | | |
| KT Tunstall | 1975– | Scottish | | |
| Paola Turci | 1964– | Italian | | |
| Tina Turner | 1939–2023 | American, later Swiss | Ike & Tina Turner | |
| Shania Twain | 1965– | Canadian | | |
| Bonnie Tyler | 1951–2026 | Welsh | | |
| Kali Uchis (Note: Other sources also refer to Uchis as a soprano) | 1993– or 1994– | Colombian-American | | |
| Grace VanderWaal | 2004– | American | | |
| Sharon Van Etten | 1981– | American | | |
| Sarah Vaughan | 1924–1990 | American | | |
| Suzanne Vega | 1959– | American | | |
| Mariska Veres | 1947–2006 | Dutch | Shocking Blue | |
| Kristine W | 1962– | American | | |
| Sloan Wainwright | 1957– | American | | |
| Albertina Walker | 1929–2010 | American | Sisters of Glory; The Caravans | |
| Emily Warren | 1992– | American | | |
| Suki Waterhouse (Note: Some sources also refer to Waterhouse as a soprano) | 1992– | English | | |
| Tionne Watkins | 1970– | American | TLC | |
| Barrett Wilbert Weed (Note: Weed is also referred to as a mezzo-soprano) | 1988– | American | | |
| Florence Welch | 1986– | English | Florence and the Machine | |
| Mae West | 1893–1980 | American | | |
| Paula West | 1959– | American | | |
| Cheryl Wheeler | 1951– | American | | |
| Trixie Whitley | 1987– | Belgian | Black Dub | |
| Kaya Wilkins | 1990– | Norwegian-American | | |
| Holly Williams | 1981– | American | | |
| Carnie Wilson | 1968– | American | Wilson Phillips | |
| Cassandra Wilson | 1955– | American | M-Base | |
| Charlotte Day Wilson | 1993– | Canadian | | |
| CeCe Winans (Note: Some sources also refer to Winans as a mezzo-soprano) | 1964– | American | BeBe & CeCe Winans | |
| Amy Winehouse | 1983–2011 | English | | |
| Lizz Wright | 1980– | American | | |
| Rachael Yamagata | 1977– | American | | |
| Lola Young | 2001– | English | | |
| Timi Yuro | 1940–2004 | American | | |
| Irina Zabiyaka | 1982- | Russian | | |
| Renée Zellweger | 1969– | American | | |

== See also ==
- List of mezzo-sopranos in non-classical music
- List of sopranos in non-classical music
- List of basses in non-classical music
- List of baritones in non-classical music
- List of tenors in non-classical music
- List of operatic contraltos
- Voice classification in non-classical music
- Voice type

== Works cited ==
- Abjorensen, Norman (2017). Historical Dictionary of Popular Music. Rowman & Littlefield. ISBN 978-1-538-10215-2.
- Dean, Maury (2003). Rock-N-Roll Gold Rush. Algora Publishing. ISBN 0-87586-207-1.
- Dicker, Chris (2017). Lady Gaga Biography: The "Mother Monster" of the Music Industry Revealed. Digital Publishing Group. ISBN 978-1-370-41794-0.
- Bogdanov, Vladimir; Erlewine, Stephen Thomas; Woodstra, Chris (2002). All Music Guide to Rock: The Definitive Guide to Rock, Pop, and Soul. Hal Leonard Corporation/Backbeat Books. ISBN 978-0-87930-653-3. OCLC 47823606.
- Sullivan, Steve (2013). Encyclopedia of Great Popular Song Recordings. Vol. 1. Scarecrow Press. ISBN 978-0-810-88296-6.
- Weintraub, Andrew N.; Barendregt, Bart, eds. (2017). Vamping the Stage: Female Voices of Asian Modernities. Honolulu: University of Hawai'i Press. ISBN 978-0-8248-6986-1.
- Weller, Sheila (2008). Girls Like Us: Carole King, Joni Mitchell, Carly Simon--And the Journey of a Generation. Simon and Schuster. ISBN 978-0-743-49147-1.
