= Star Anna =

American singer and guitarist

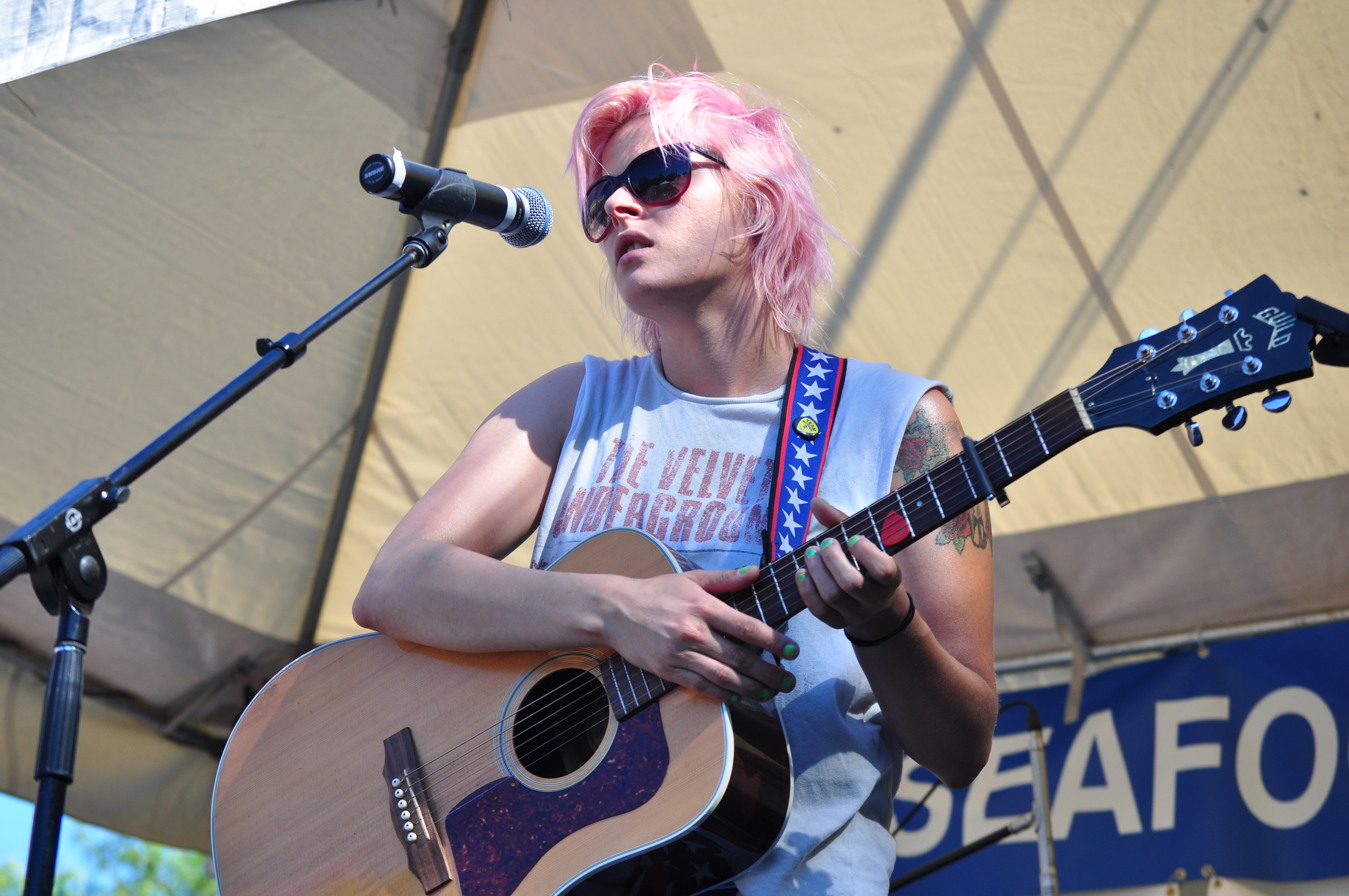
- Star Anna in 2013

Star Anna Constantia Krogstie Bamford is an American singer and guitarist from Ellensburg, Washington who plays Americana and alt-country. Her band Star Anna and the Laughing Dogs includes Justin Davis (guitar), Keith Ash (bass), and Travis Yost (drums). Since summer 2010, the band has also included Ty Bailie on keyboards. Davis replaced original guitarist Corey Dosch, who left the band to pursue his Ph.D.; Ash replaced earlier bassist Frank Johnson.

== Life and musical career ==
Star Anna was born in 1986. She began playing drums at the age of 11. During high school, she played in a punk rock band named No Continuous Standing as a drummer. When she reached the age of 16, she became a guitarist and started writing songs. Her early songs were specifically Christian but later expanded to include personal material in her songs.

Star Anna and the Laughing Dogs appeared with the Seattle Symphony Orchestra on October 26, 2012. The orchestra performed two of Star Anna's songs, arranged by Scott Teske, and a piece composed by Teske with lyrics by Star Anna.

In his weekly column for Seattle alternative press weekly The Stranger, Duff McKagan wrote positively regarding her singing voice.

== Discography ==
- Crooked Path (2008)
- The Only Thing That Matters (2009)
- Alone in This Together (2011)
- Call Your Girlfriend (Single) (2012)
- Go to Hell (2013) with Ty Bailie (keyboards/organ/piano), Julian McDonough (drums), Jacques Willis (vibraphones), Will Moore (bass), and Jeff Fielder (guitars)
- The Sky Is Falling (2014)
- Light in the Window (2016)
- Love & Sex & Fear Of Death (2024)
