= List of people from Madison, Wisconsin =

The following notable people are or have been associated with Madison, Wisconsin.

== Artists and architects ==
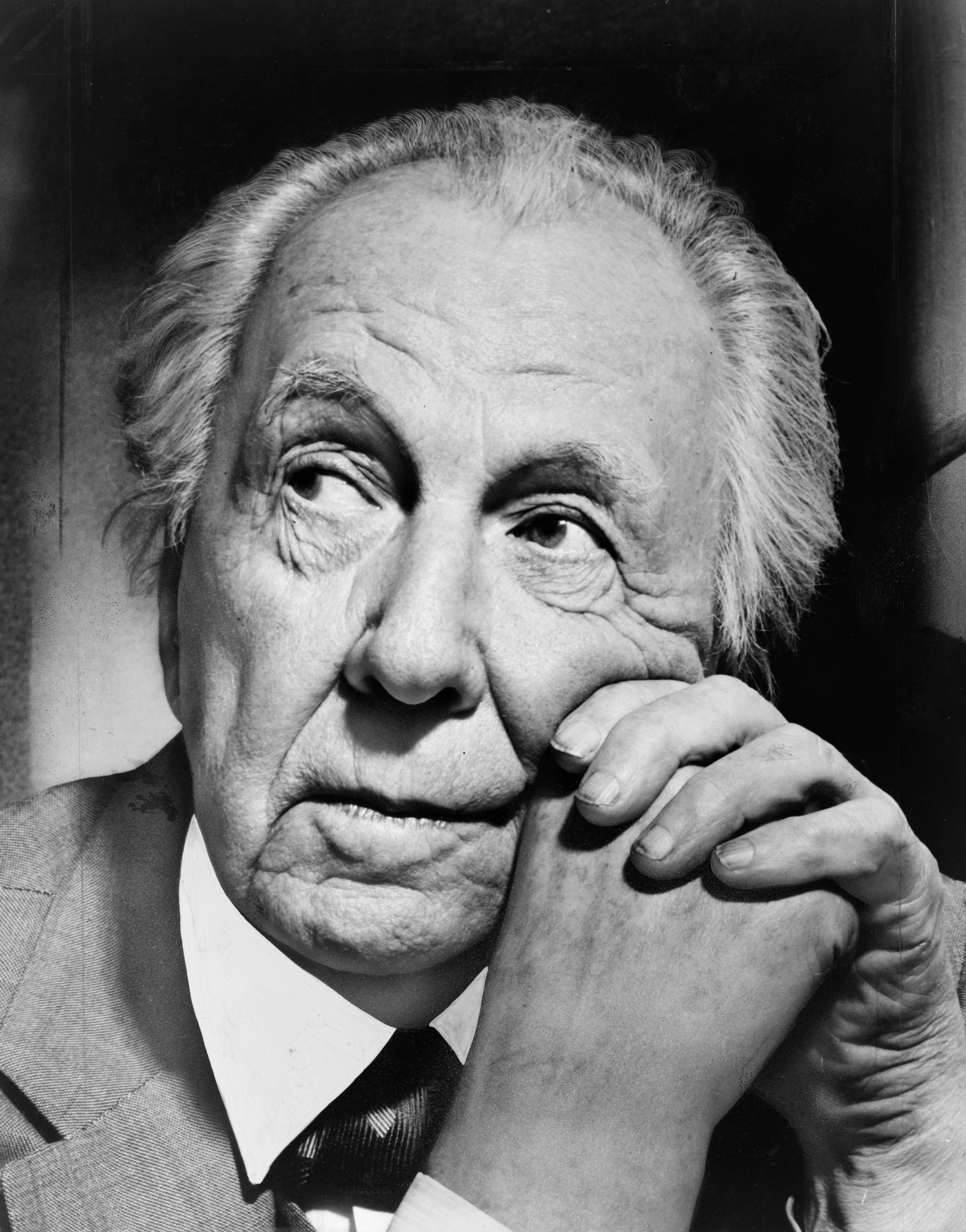
Frank Lloyd Wright

- Ruth Ball, sculptor
- Homer Fieldhouse, landscape architect
- Georgia O'Keeffe, artist; born in the suburb of Sun Prairie, she attended high school in Madison at Sacred Heart Academy, now Edgewood High School of the Sacred Heart
- Vinnie Ream, sculptor of the statue of Lincoln in the U.S. Capitol rotunda
- Steve Rude, comic book artist
- Maria Schneider, illustrator
- Simon Sparrow, mixed media artist
- Michael Velliquette, artist
- Frank Lloyd Wright, architect

== Athletes and sports figures ==
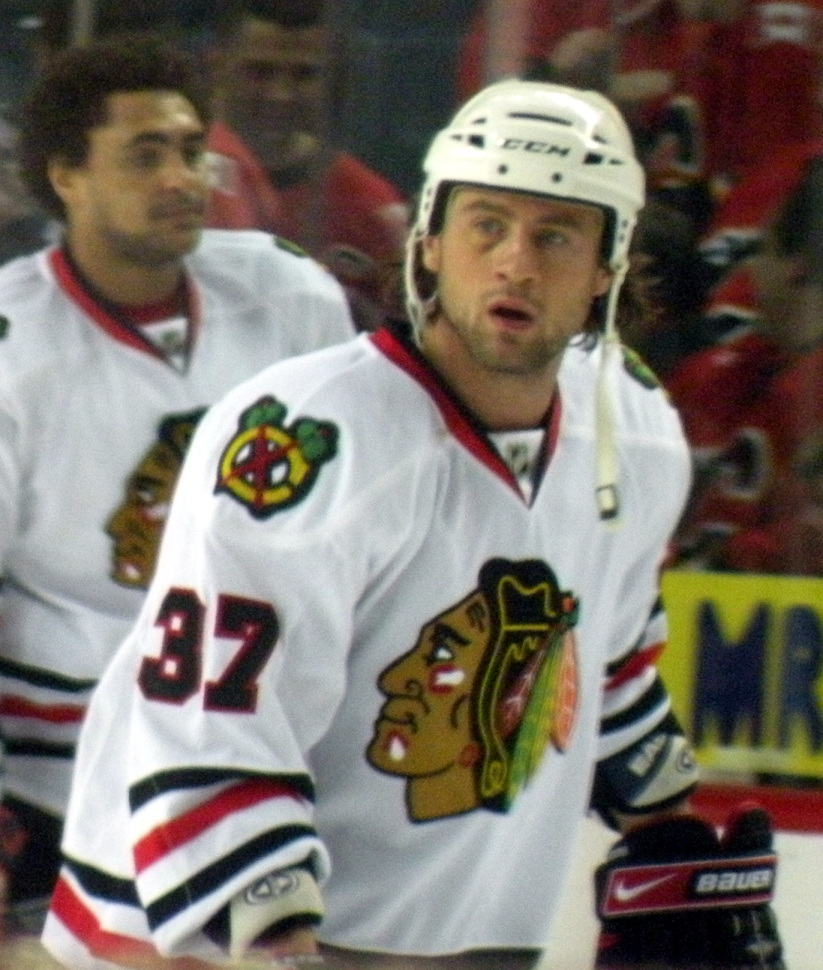
Adam Burish

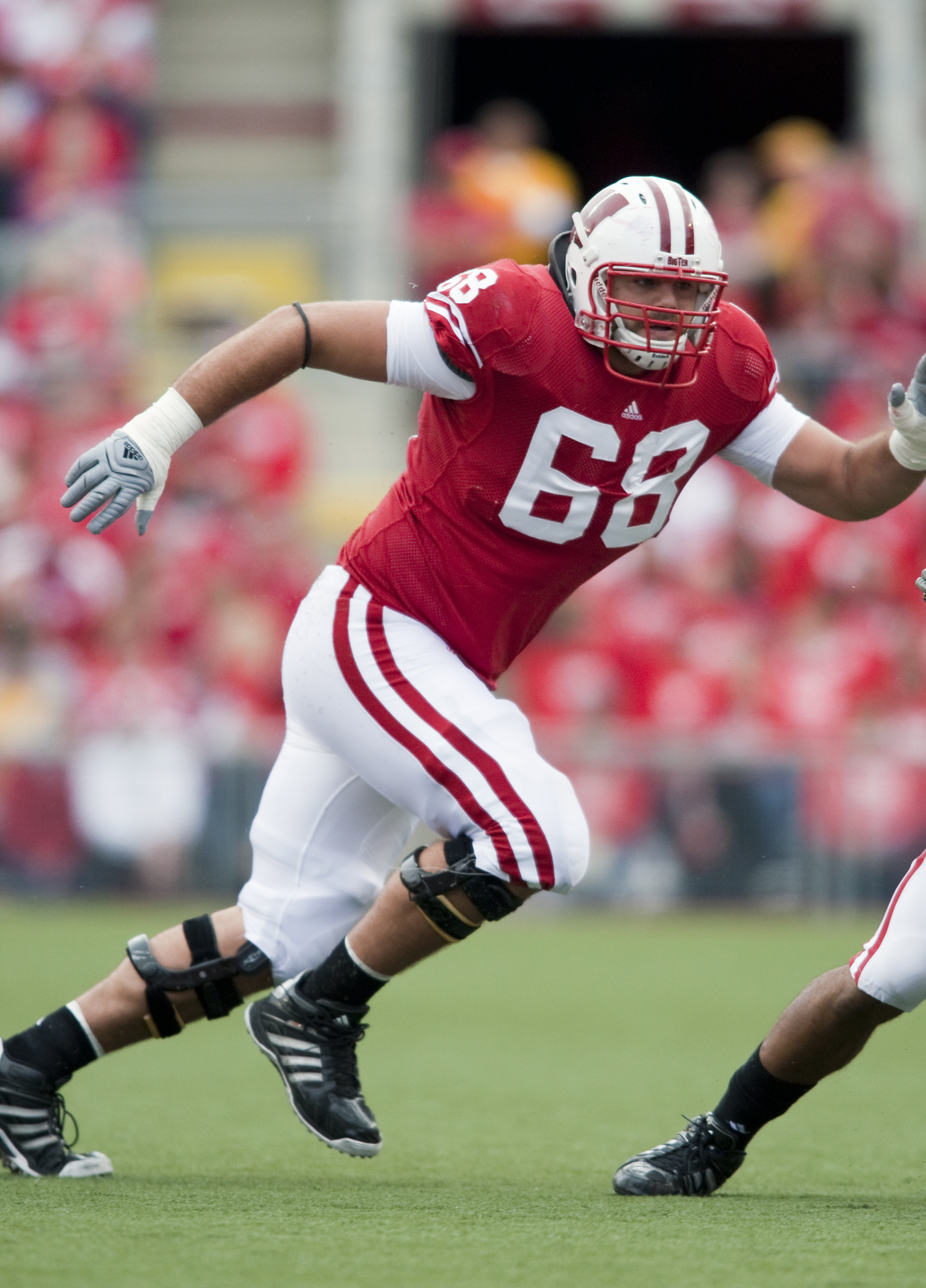
Gabe Carimi

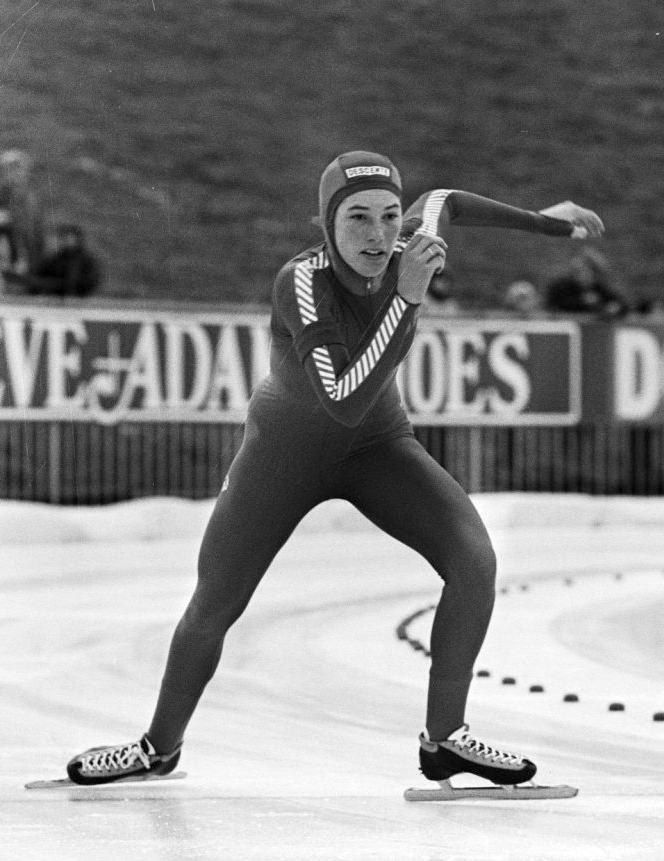
Alice Hobbins Porter

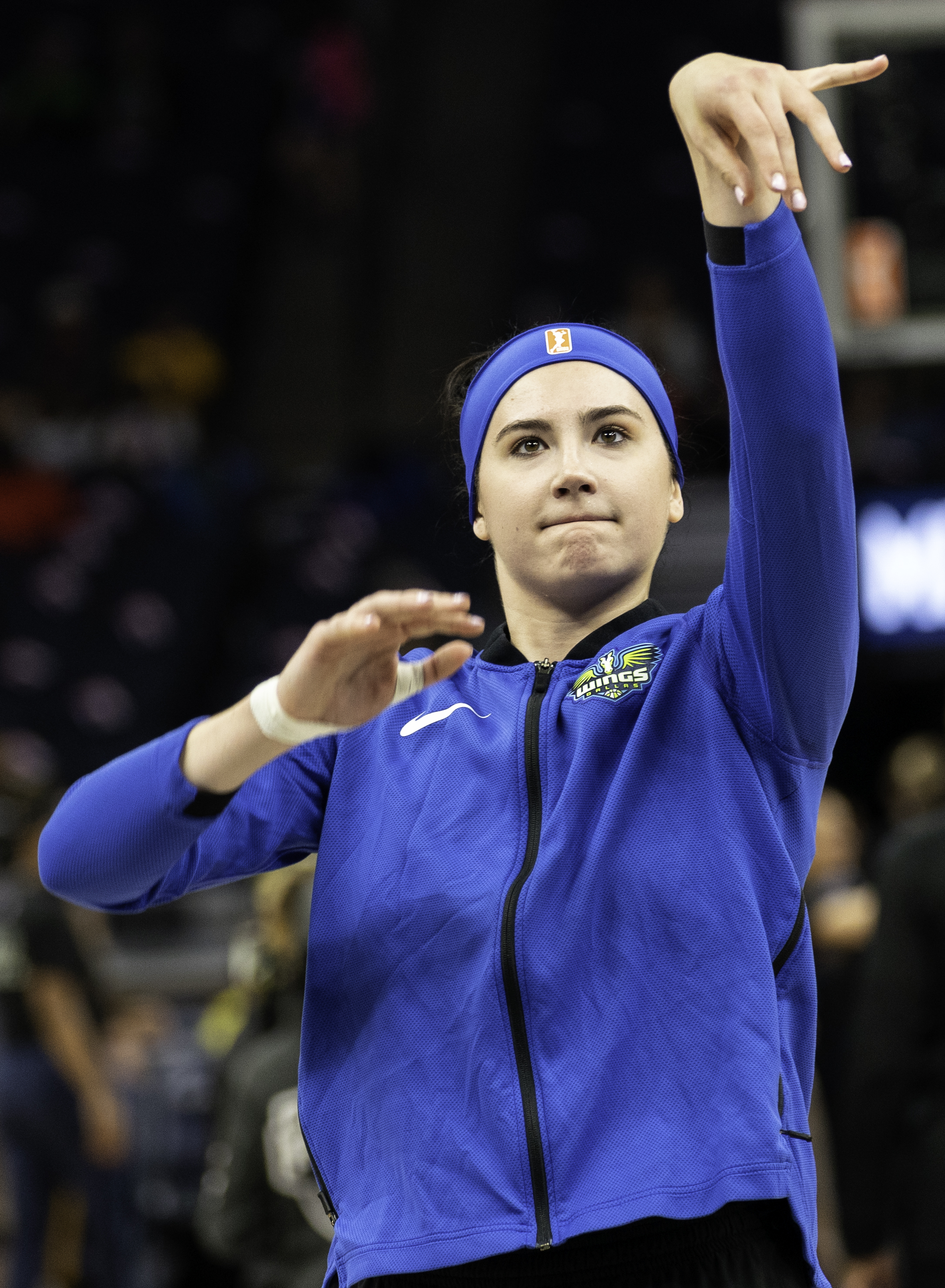
Megan Gustafson

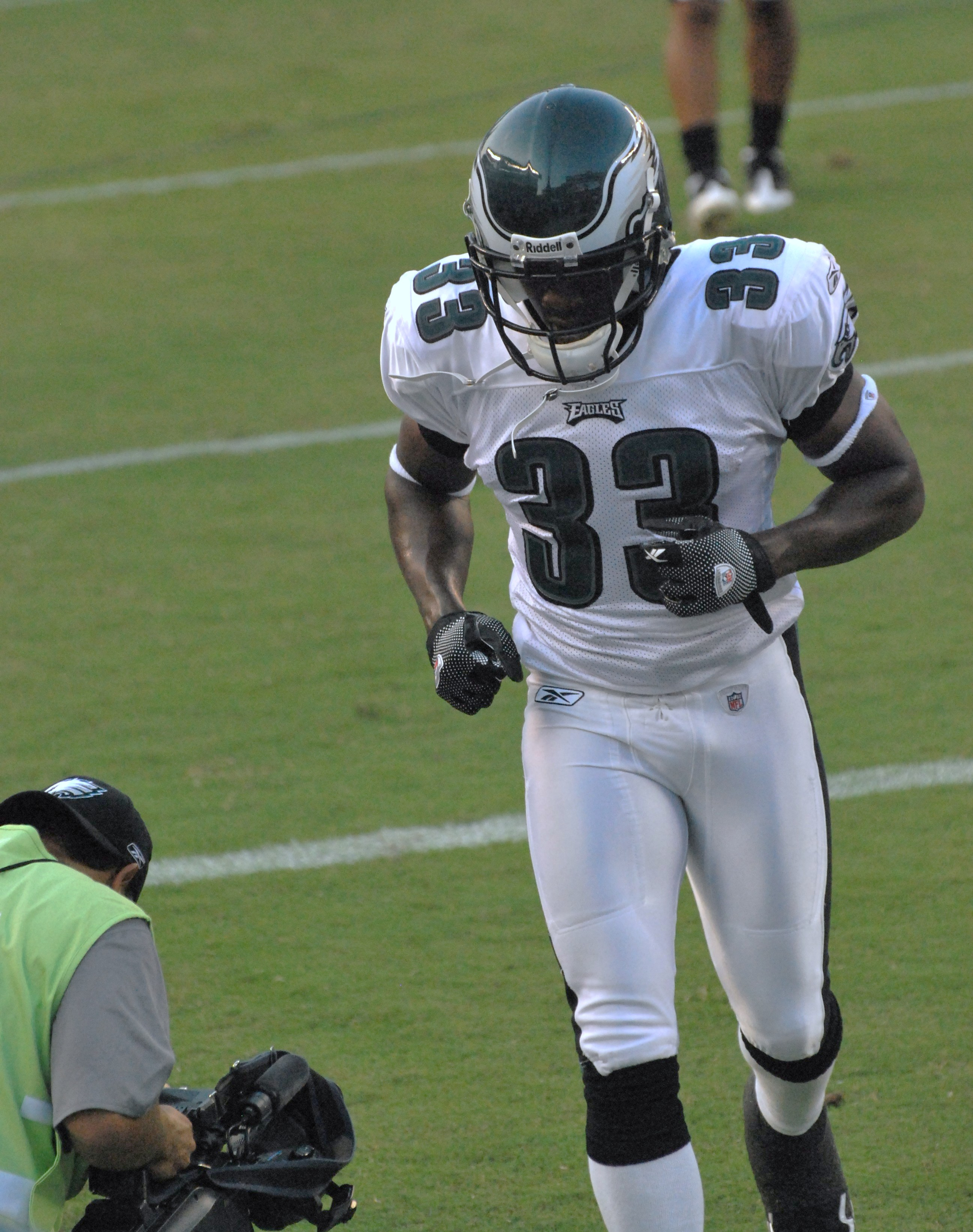
Jack Ikegwuonu

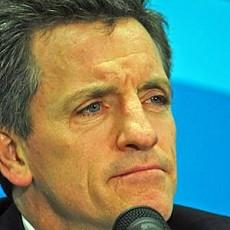
Mark Johnson

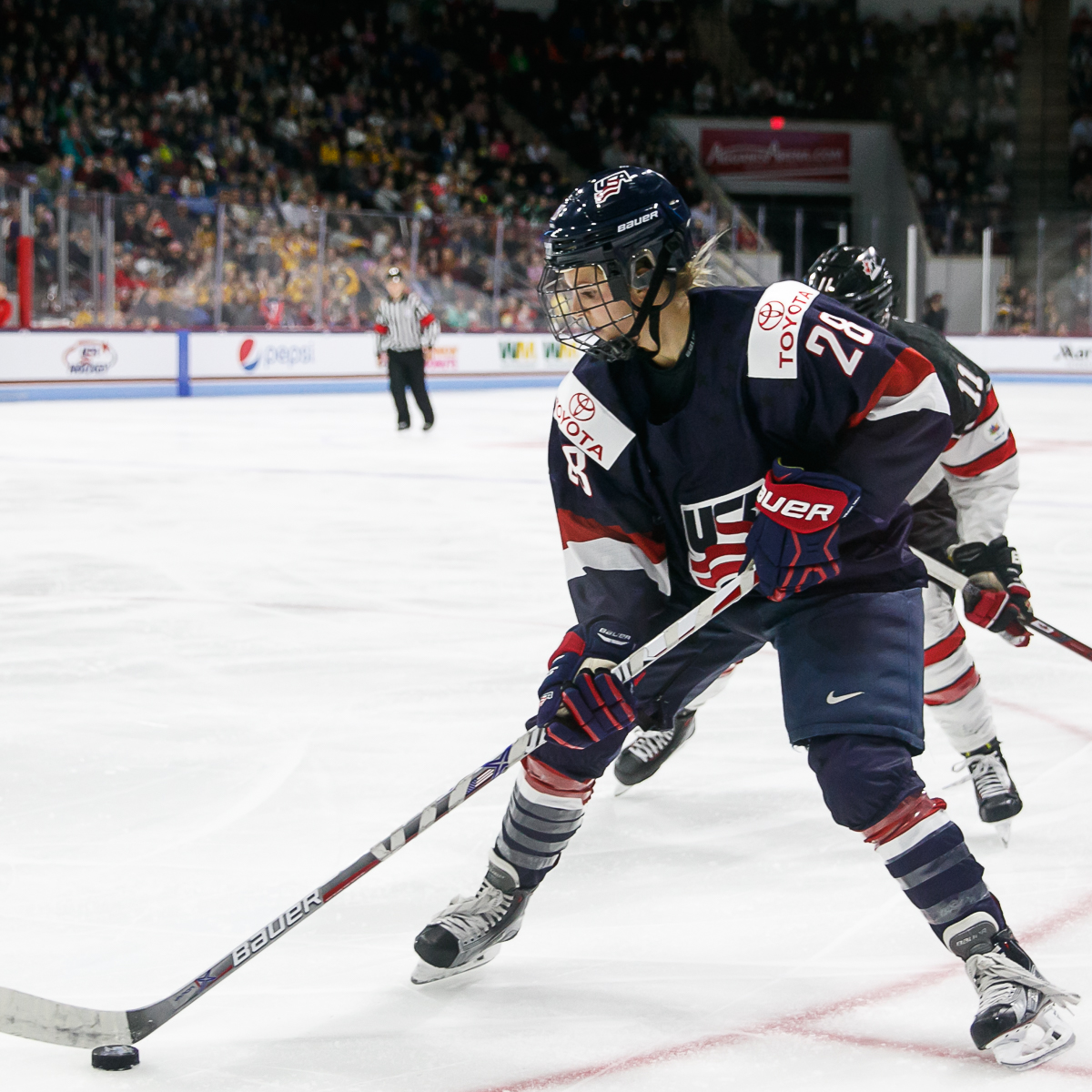
Amanda Kessel

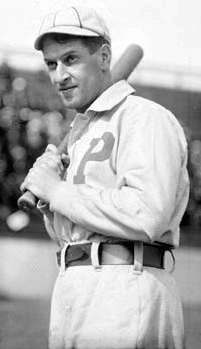
Kid Nichols

- Frank Baker, NFL player
- Jim Bakken, NFL player
- Drake Baldwin, MLB player
- Peter Barrett, Olympic gold medalist
- Ed Barry, MLB player
- Sam Barry, head coach of the Iowa Hawkeyes men's basketball team and USC Trojans men's basketball, baseball, and football teams; member of the Naismith Memorial Basketball Hall of Fame
- Les Bartholomew, MLB player
- Marc Behrend, NHL player
- Henry Benn, baseball player
- Dave Besteman, Olympic athlete
- Sandy Botham, head coach of the University of Wisconsin–Milwaukee Panthers women's basketball team
- Jules Boykoff, academic, author, and soccer player
- Gene Brabender, MLB player for the Los Angeles Dodgers, Baltimore Orioles and the Seattle Pilots/Milwaukee Brewers
- Art Bramhall, MLB player
- Tyrone Braxton, NFL player
- Alex Brooks, NHL player
- Craig Brown, national champion curler
- Erika Brown, national champion curler
- Bob Bruer, NFL player
- Roman Brumm, NFL player
- Adam Burish, NHL player
- John Byce, NHL player
- Gabe Carimi, All-American football player
- Connie Carpenter-Phinney, road cyclist and ice speed skater; winner of first-ever women's Olympic road race (1984)
- Charlie Chech, MLB player
- Bruce Christensen, MLB player
- Geep Chryst, quarterbacks coach of the San Francisco 49ers
- Paul Chryst, former head coach of the University of Wisconsin football team
- Rick Chryst, commissioner of the Mid-American Conference, 1999–2009
- John Coatta, NFL scout
- Eddie Cochems, "father of the forward pass"
- Bill Cofield, head coach of the Wisconsin Badgers men's basketball team; first African American head coach of a major sport in the Big Ten Conference; 1976–1982
- Casey Cramer, NFL player
- Annabelle Cripps, Olympic athlete
- Kevin Dean, NHL player
- Dorcas Denhartog, Olympic athlete
- Mary Docter, Olympic athlete
- Sarah Docter, Olympic athlete
- Clarence Esser, NFL player
- Paul Feldhausen, professional football player
- Casey FitzRandolph, Olympic gold medalist
- Mary Froning, AAGPBL player
- Steve Furniss, Olympic medalist, Pan American Games gold medalist
- Reece Gaines, NBA player for the Orlando Magic, Houston Rockets, and the Milwaukee Bucks
- Vern Geishert, MLB player
- Gale Gillingham, NFL player
- Mike Gosling, professional baseball player
- Carie Graves, Olympic gold medalist, head coach of the Harvard Crimson and Texas Longhorns women's crew teams
- Steve Green, NBA player
- Paul Gruber, NFL player
- Megan Gustafson, WNBA player for the Las Vegas Aces
- Dale Hackbart, NFL player for the Green Bay Packers, Washington Redskins, Minnesota Vikings, St. Louis Cardinals, and the Denver Broncos
- Donald Hayes, NFL player
- Beth Heiden, Olympic speedskater
- Eric Heiden, Olympic speedskater
- Russell Hellickson, Olympic wrestler
- Phil Hellmuth, professional poker player
- Jack Ikegwuonu, NFL player
- Dan Immerfall, Olympic medalist, head referee for the International Skating Union, member of National Speedskating Hall of Fame
- Mark Johnson, 1980 Miracle on Ice USA Olympic hockey team gold medalist, NHL player
- Nicole Joraanstad, national champion curler
- Tim Jordan, NFL player
- Jerry Kelly, professional golfer
- Amanda Kessel, Olympic gold medalist in women's ice hockey and NWHL player for the Metropolitan Riveters
- Phil Kessel, NHL player for the Vegas Golden Knights
- Logan Ketterer, soccer player
- Gordon King, NFL player
- George Kittle, NFL player for the San Francisco 49ers
- Phyllis Koehn, AAGPBL player
- Scott Kooistra, NFL player
- Joe Kurth, NFL player
- Dan Lanphear, professional football player
- Debi Laszewski, IFBB professional bodybuilder
- Mike London, professional football player
- Helene Madison, won three gold medals at the 1932 Olympics in swimming
- Wesley Matthews, basketball player
- Greg Mattison, NFL coach
- Jeronne Maymon (born 1991), basketball player for Hapoel Eilat B.C. of the Israeli Basketball Premier League
- Dave McClain, head coach of the Ball State Cardinals and Wisconsin Badgers football teams
- Debbie McCormick, world champion curler, Olympic athlete
- Milton McPike, NFL player
- Walter Meanwell, former head coach of the Wisconsin Badgers men's basketball team, member of the Naismith Memorial Basketball Hall of Fame
- Bob Mionske, Olympic athlete
- Jim Montgomery, world champion swimmer, Olympic gold medalist, member of the International Swimming Hall of Fame
- Eric Morel, boxer, former WBA Flyweight champion
- Peter Mueller, Olympic speed skater
- Pat Neshek, MLB player
- Rick Neuheisel, NFL player, former head coach of the UCLA Bruins football team
- Kid Nichols, member of the Baseball Hall of Fame
- Andy North, professional golfer
- Jay Norvell, NFL player, head coach of the Nevada Wolf Pack football team
- Jeff Nygaard, Olympic athlete
- Karl Pagel, MLB player
- Bill Reay, NHL player and head coach
- Rick Reichardt, MLB player
- Andrew Rein, Olympic wrestler, winner of a silver medal
- Barry Richter, hockey player
- Pat Richter, NFL player, member of the College Football Hall of Fame, athletic director of the University of Wisconsin–Madison
- Libby Riddles, first woman to win the Iditarod Trail Sled Dog Race
- Michelle Rohl, Olympic athlete, Pan American Games medalist
- Dan Schachte, former NHL official
- Nick Schmaltz, NHL player
- Pete Schmitt, NFL player
- Jack Skille, right winger for the Rockford IceHogs of the AHL
- Shaka Smart, head coach of the Texas Longhorns men's basketball team
- Craig Smith, NHL player
- Zane Smith, MLB player
- Chris Solinsky, professional runner
- Bill Southworth, MLB player
- Dave Stalls, NFL player
- Derek Stanley, NFL player
- Ken Starch, NFL player
- Sherri Steinhauer, LPGA player
- Lisa Stone, head coach of the Wisconsin Badgers women's basketball team
- Tim Stracka, NFL player
- Steve Stricker, professional golfer
- Eric Studesville, head coach of the Denver Broncos in the NFL
- Bob Suter, 1980 Miracle on Ice USA Olympic hockey team gold medalist
- Gary Suter, retired NHL player
- Ryan Suter, NHL player
- Lindsay Tarpley, WPS player
- Matt Tegenkamp, professional distance runner
- Donnel Thompson, NFL player
- Al Toon, former professional football player
- Stu Voigt, NFL player
- Jack Waite, professional tennis player
- Pete Waite, head coach of the Wisconsin Badgers women's volleyball team
- Lisa Wang, national champion rhythmic gymnast
- Henry Willegale, NFL player
- Brad Winchester, NHL player
- Ari Wolfe, sports announcer
- Tony Yelk, NFL player
- Jackie Zoch, Olympic medalist

== Business and industry figures ==
- Noah Dietrich, CEO of the majority of enterprises owned by Howard Hughes, including RKO Pictures, Trans World Airlines, and Hughes Aircraft
- Judith R. Faulkner, CEO and founder of Epic Systems
- John Geisse, founder of Target Corporation
- Burton E. Green, one of the developers of Beverly Hills, California
- Alex Jordan, Jr., businessman, architect
- Peter Koechley, co-founder of Upworthy and former managing editor of The Onion
- Jim Lillie, CEO of Jarden Corporation; spent a part of his childhood there and attended the UW in 1983
- Oscar G. Mayer, Jr., chairman of Oscar Mayer
- Oscar G. Mayer, Sr., chairman of Oscar Mayer
- Odessa Piper, chef and co-founder of the restaurant L'Etoile
- Pleasant Rowland, businesswoman, creator of the American Girl product line

== Entertainers ==
=== Actors, radio personalities, and filmmakers ===
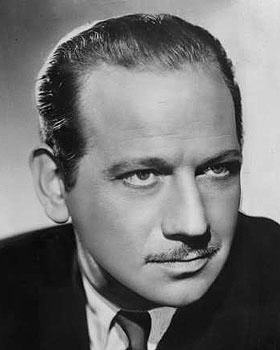
Melvyn Douglas

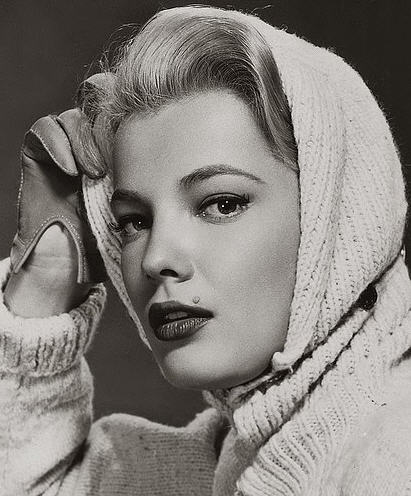
Gena Rowlands

- Andrea Anders, actress, comedian
- Randy Chestnut, comedian, actor, 17-year resident of Madison
- Michael Cole, actor
- Tyne Daly, Emmy and Tony Award-winning actress
- Melvyn Douglas, Academy Award-winning actor
- Chris Farley, actor, comedian, grew up in Madison
- John P. Farley, actor and comedian
- Kevin Farley, actor
- Michael Feldman, radio personality for Public Radio International
- Nick Grinde (1893–1979), film director and screenwriter
- Uta Hagen, actress, recipient of the National Medal of Arts
- Kurt Johnson, radio personality, director for RKO, CBS, Viacom and others
- Nietzchka Keene, filmmaker
- Imran Khan, Bollywood actor
- Rob Marshall, Academy Award-nominated director
- Sandra Nelson, actress
- Chris Noth, actor, born in Madison
- Zorba Paster, radio show host
- Bill Rebane, filmmaker
- Grace Reiter, actress and comedian, born in Madison
- Ann Risley, actress
- Gena Rowlands, Oscar-nominated, Golden Globe and Emmy-winning actress
- Matt Sloan, voice actor, comedian
- Mary Sweeney, film editor and producer, partner of director David Lynch
- J.D. Walsh, actor
- Marc Webb, film, television, and music video director
- Bradley Whitford, actor, born in Madison
- Gideon Yago, CBS and MTV News correspondent
- Leigh Zimmerman, actress

=== Musicians ===
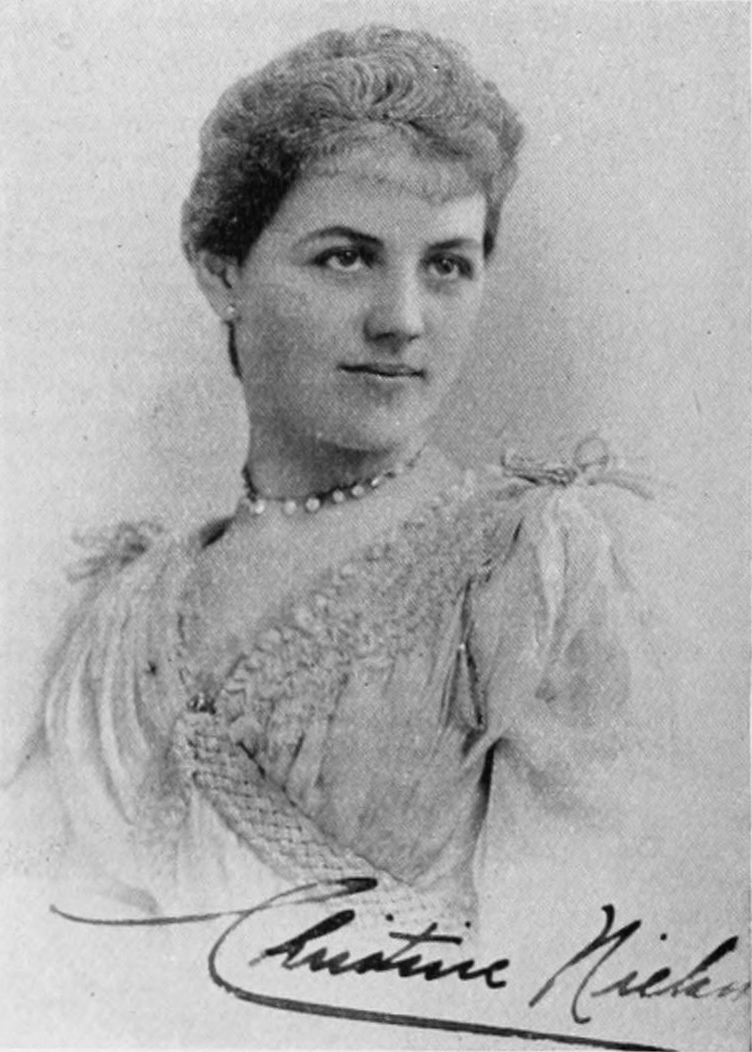
Christine Nielson Dreier

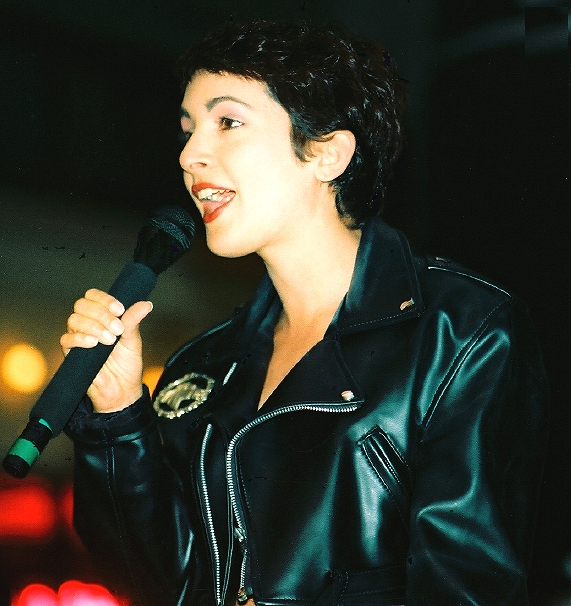
Jane Wiedlin

- Brother Ali, hip hop musician
- Lou and Peter Berryman, musicians and songwriters
- Jeff Conrad, drummer of Phantom Planet
- Brent Michael Davids, composer for the National Symphony Orchestra
- Richard Davis, bassist and professor at the University of Wisconsin–Madison
- John DeMain, conductor
- Christine Nielson Dreier, singer
- Ari Herstand, musician, actor, blogger
- Nick Hexum, musician, lead vocalist of 311
- Lee Hoiby, composer
- INOJ, singer and songwriter
- Zola Jesus, musician; raised in Merrill and got her start in Madison
- Jennifer Korbee, member of Hi-5; contestant on American Idol
- Alicia Lemke, singer, famous for appearing on Matt Harding's "Where the Hell is Matt?" video
- Barbara K. MacDonald, musician
- Pat MacDonald, musician
- Joel McNeely, composer
- Billy Moll, songwriter
- Tracy Nelson, singer
- Geoff Palmer, musician, singer, and songwriter; member of The Connection, the Kurt Baker band, and The Queers
- Otis Redding, musician, died in Madison
- Art Paul Schlosser, musician
- Jim Schwall, musician, singer-songwriter
- Ben Sidran, musician, jazz pianist
- Clyde Stubblefield, musician, died in Madison
- Butch Vig, alternative music producer and drummer of Garbage; from Viroqua, got his start in Madison
- Chris Vrenna, musician and producer
- Ben Weasel, lead singer and guitarist of the punk rock band Screeching Weasel
- Jane Wiedlin, musician and actress
- Glenn Worf, Nashville session bass player
- Yung Gravy, hip hop musician

== Government officials, politicians, and activists ==
- Stacey Abrams, Georgia State politician
- Henry Cullen Adams, U.S. representative
- Rasmus B. Anderson, U.S. diplomat
- Dwight Armstrong (1951–2010), perpetrator of the Sterling Hall bombing
- David Atwood, Mayor of Madison, newspaper publisher/editor, U.S. representative
- Tammy Baldwin, U.S. senator for Wisconsin
- George V. Borchsenius, first clerk of the court of the Nome judicial division of Alaska
- Dorothy Bradley, Montana state legislator
- John R. Burke, U.S. diplomat
- Michael J. Cantwell, Wisconsin state assemblyman
- Richard Cates, Wisconsin legislator and lawyer
- William Charlton, Wisconsin state assemblyman and farmer
- Liz Cheney, U.S. representative from Wyoming
- Jason Crow, U.S. representative from Colorado
- Leo Crowley, head of the Foreign Economic Administration
- Dexter Curtis, Wisconsin legislator and inventor
- Joseph E. Davies, U.S. diplomat
- Abiol Lual Deng, South Sudanese-American political scientist
- Brian Detter, Navy official, activist
- Jim Doyle, governor of Wisconsin 2003–2011
- Scott Evertz, first openly gay director of the Office of National AIDS Policy
- William T. Evjue, Wisconsin State Assemblyman; founder of The Capital Times
- Lucius Fairchild, U.S. diplomat
- Thomas E. Fairchild, chief judge of the U.S. Court of Appeals
- Leonard J. Farwell, governor of Wisconsin
- Bill Foster, U.S. representative for Illinois
- Louis E. Gettle, politician
- John D. Gurnee, Wisconsin State Assembly
- Everis A. Hayes, U.S. representative from California
- Charles N. Herreid, governor of South Dakota
- Charles W. Heyl, Wisconsin State Assembly
- Benjamin F. Hopkins, U.S. representative
- Eric Hovde, businessman and politician
- Burr W. Jones, U.S. representative
- Philip Mayer Kaiser, diplomat
- Scott L. Klug, U.S. representative 1991–1999
- Randall S. Knox, lawyer, politician, businessman
- Kris Kobach, professor, politician
- Thomas F. Konop, U.S. representative
- Clifford Krueger, politician
- Julius Albert Krug, U.S. Secretary of the Interior
- Belle Case La Follette, activist
- Bronson La Follette, Wisconsin attorney general
- Doug La Follette, Wisconsin secretary of state, environmental activist, writer
- Fola La Follette, activist
- Philip La Follette, governor of Wisconsin
- Robert M. La Follette, Jr., U.S. senator
- Robert M. La Follette, Sr., populist, senator, attorney
- Francis Lamb, politician and lawyer
- Richard Lamm, governor of Colorado
- James B. Loken, judge of the U.S. Court of Appeals
- Willett Main, Wisconsin state senator
- Cheri Maples, Wisconsin lawyer, police officer, and peace activist
- Ben Masel, original Yippee, hemp and marijuana legalization activist
- Teresa McGovern, daughter of presidential candidate George McGovern
- Wayne L. Morse, U.S. senator from Oregon
- Earl Mullen, politician and barber
- Herman Natwick, member of the Dakota Territory legislature
- Gaylord Nelson, U.S. senator, founder of Earth Day
- John M. Nelson, U.S. representative
- William Proxmire, U.S. senator
- Charles R. Robertson, U.S. representative from North Dakota
- Harry Sauthoff, lawyer and politician
- Albert G. Schmedeman, U.S. diplomat
- Stuart Nash Scott, U.S. diplomat
- Ithamar Sloan, U.S. representative
- Paul Soglin, mayor 1973–1979, 1989–1997, 2011–2019
- John Coit Spooner, U.S. senator
- John Mellen Thurston, U.S. senator from Nebraska; namesake of Thurston County, Nebraska
- Marjorie Turnbull, Florida state representative
- William F. Vilas, U.S. Postmaster General and U.S. Secretary of the Interior
- Floyd E. Wheeler, Wisconsin State Assembly
- William Wheeler, Wisconsin territorial legislator
- Frank E. Wheelock, a founder and first mayor of Lubbock, Texas; reared in Madison
- Rebecca Young, Wisconsin State Assembly

== Military figures ==
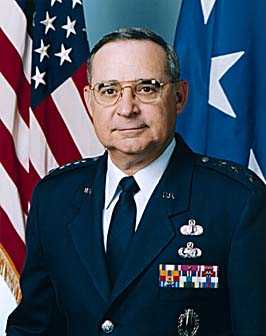
Eugene L. Tattini

- George E. Bryant, U.S. Army brigadier general
- Joseph Cable, Medal of Honor recipient
- Charles L. Harris, Union Army brigadier general
- Frank A. Haskell, Union Army colonel; author of a noted account of the Battle of Gettysburg
- William Hawley, Union Army brigadier general
- John Higgins, U.S. Navy rear admiral (upper half)
- Donald S. Jones, U.S. Navy vice admiral
- William Lorenz, Army Distinguished Service Medal recipient
- John Birdsell Oren, U.S. Coast Guard rear admiral
- Carson Abel Roberts, U.S. Marine Corps lieutenant general
- Clayton K. Slack, Medal of Honor recipient
- Eugene L. Tattini, U.S. Air Force lieutenant general
- Albert Taubert, Navy Cross and Distinguished Service Cross recipient
- Karl G. Taylor, Sr., Medal of Honor recipient
- Ralph Wise Zwicker, U.S. Army major general

== Miscellaneous ==
- Tunnel Bob, famous resident
- Dwight Armstrong, took part in the Sterling Hall bombing in 1970
- Carlo Peter Caputo, alleged Italian American gangster and businessman
- Bill Horstmeyer, race car driver
- Awonder Liang, chess prodigy, third youngest Grandmaster in US chess history
- Richard Ragsdale, physician who litigated against excessive abortion regulation

== Religious figures ==
- Matthew Fox, Episcopal priest
- Jerome J. Hastrich, bishop of the Roman Catholic Diocese of Gallup
- Byron C. Nelson, Lutheran minister and apologist for creationism
- Manfred Swarsensky, rabbi

== Scholars and scientists ==
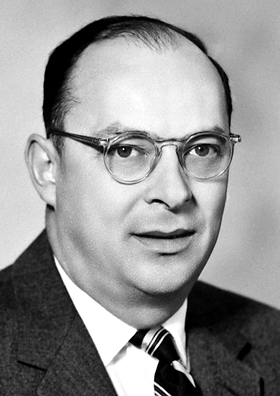
John Bardeen

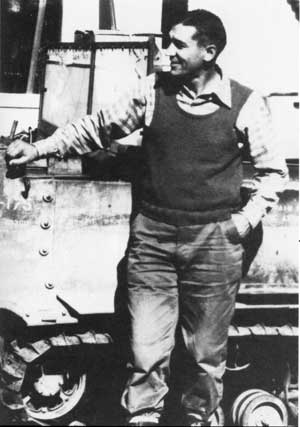
A. Starker Leopold

- Ann Althouse, law professor, scholar and blogger
- John Bardeen, Nobel laureate, named one of the 20th century's most influential Americans by Life magazine
- Arthur Louis Breslich, president of German Wallace College and Baldwin-Wallace College
- Ernest J. Briskey, creator of the American Meat Science Association
- W. Wallace Cleland, University of Wisconsin–Madison biochemist; inventor of Cleland's reagent
- Scott Cutlip, dean of the University of Georgia College of Journalism and Mass Communication
- Richard Davidson, neuroscientist, director of the Center for Investigating Healthy Minds University of Wisconsin–Madison
- Hector DeLuca, biochemist and founder and president of Deltanoid Pharmaceuticals
- Richard Dugdale, oceanographer and fellow of the American Association for the Advancement of Science
- Harvey Goldberg, historian and professor
- Harlan Hanson, director of the Advanced Placement program 1965–1989
- Howard Hibbard, art historian, professor at Columbia University
- John Duer Irving, geologist
- Henry A. Lardy, biochemist
- Aldo Leopold, ecologist
- A. Carl Leopold, graduate dean at the University of Nebraska–Lincoln
- A. Starker Leopold, professor of Zoology and Conservation at the University of California, Berkeley
- Luna Leopold, professor of Geology and Geophysics and of Landscape Architecture at the University of California, Berkeley
- William Shainline Middleton, co-founder and Secretary-Treasurer of American Board of Internal Medicine
- George Mosse, historian, professor
- John Muir, Scottish-born American naturalist, author and early advocate of preservation of U.S. wilderness
- Gerhard Brandt Naeseth, genealogist
- Lorrie Otto, environmentalist
- Leon E. Rosenberg, physician-scientist, geneticist, and educator
- Jay P. Sanford, author of the Sanford Guide to Antimicrobial Therapy
- Sumner Slichter, economist, professor at Harvard University
- Kurt Squire, director of the Games, Learning & Society Conference
- Harry Steenbock, biochemist, researcher of Vitamin D
- James Thomson, leading stem cell researcher
- Jan Vansina, historian and anthropologist
- I. Bernard Weinstein, physician
- Ira Loren Wiggins, botanist
- James Wright, president of Dartmouth College

== Writers and journalists ==
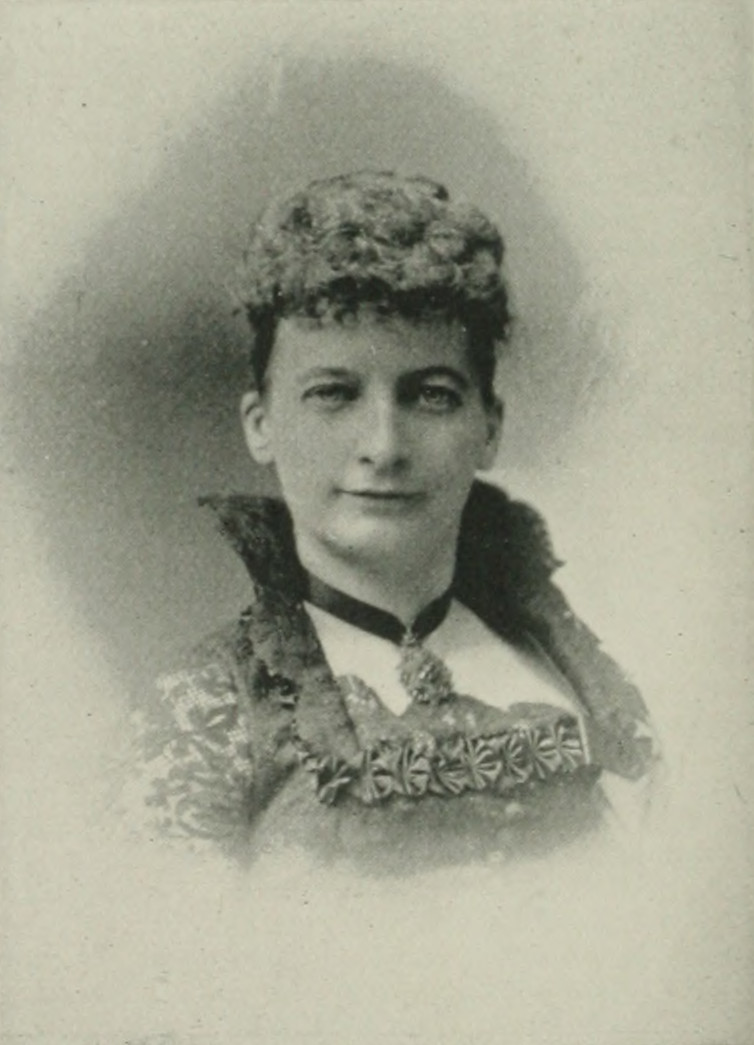
Alice Hobbins Porter

- Carl Thomas Anderson, cartoonist
- Mike Baron, comic book writer famous for creating Nexus
- Lowell Bergman, TV news producer
- Deborah Blum, journalist and professor
- Barbara Fister, author, blogger and librarian
- Jason Gastrow, Videogamedunkey, video game reviewer, humorist, YouTube personality
- Annie Laurie Gaylor, author and activist with Freethought Today
- Jeff Gillan, journalist
- Kevin Henkes, children's book author, graduated from UW–Madison, as of 1996 "makes his home in Madison"
- Ed Janus, journalist
- Gloria Ladson-Billings, professor and author
- David Maraniss, journalist and author, recipient of the Pulitzer Prize
- Karl E. Meyer, journalist
- Jacquelyn Mitchard, author
- Lorrie Moore, prize-winning author of short stories
- Jessica Nelson North, author
- Alice Hobbins Porter, journalist, editor
- Richard Quinney, author and photographer
- Phil Rosenthal, columnist
- Patrick Rothfuss, writer of epic fantasy
- Greg Dean Schmitz, online film journalist, creator of Upcomingmovies.com, columnist for Rotten Tomatoes
- Alice Sebold, author
- Scott Stantis, editorial cartoonist for the Chicago Tribune; creator of the comic strips The Buckets and Prickly City
- John Tuschen, poet
- Connie Wanek, poet
- Ella Wheeler Wilcox, poet ("Laugh and the world laughs with you"); grew up in Madison
- Amos Wilder, poet and theologian
- Thornton Wilder, Pulitzer Prize-winning novelist and playwright

== See also ==
- List of University of Wisconsin–Madison people
