= Taubert =

Taubert is a German surname. Notable people with the surname include:

- Albert Taubert (1900–1964), United States Marine
- Agnes Taubert (1844–1877), German writer and philosopher
- Eberhard Taubert (1907–1976), German propagandist
- Emil Taubert (1844–1895), German philologist and writer, and younger brother of Wilhelm Taubert
- Ernst Eduard Taubert (1838–1934), Pomeranian composer and music critic
- Frank Taubert (born 1956), German diver
- Gottfried Taubert (1670–1746), German dance master (maître de danse)
- Jean-Léonard Taubert de Massy, Baron Taubert (born 1974), member of the Princely House of Monaco
- Mark Taubert (born 1975), German Palliative Care Professor
- Paul Hermann Wilhelm Taubert (1862–1897), German botanist
- Siegfried Taubert (1880–1946) German nazi and SS-Obergruppenführer
- Steven Taubert (born 1953), Australian footballer
- Wilhelm Taubert (1811–1891), also known as Carl Gottfried Wilhelm Taubert; German composer
