= Tushen =

Tushen may refer to:

- Tushen, Ukhrul, a village in Manipur, India
- Tǔshén, or Tudishen, a Chinese deity

== See also ==
- Tuixent, a village in Catalonia, Spain
- John Tuschen, American poet
