= List of operatic contraltos =

The contralto voice in opera and classical music has a range which typically lies between the F below middle C (F_{3}) to two Fs above middle C (F_{5}). In the lower and upper extremes, some contralto voices can sing from the E below middle C (E_{3}) to two B♭s above middle C (B♭_{5}). The contralto voice has the lowest tessitura of the female voices and is noted for its rich and deep vocal timbre. True operatic contraltos are very rare. The following is a list of contralto singers who have regularly performed unamplified classical or operatic music in concert halls and/or opera houses.

== A–L ==
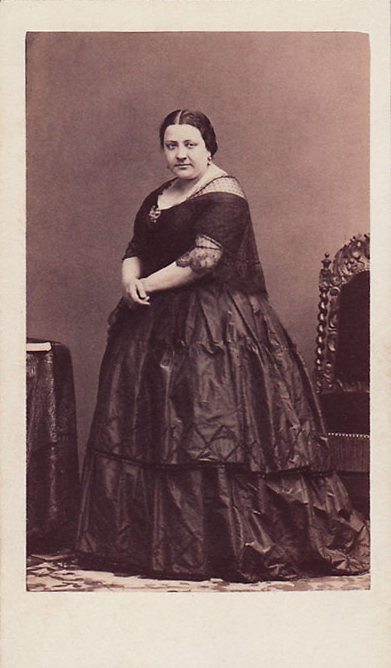
Italian-born contralto Marietta Alboni

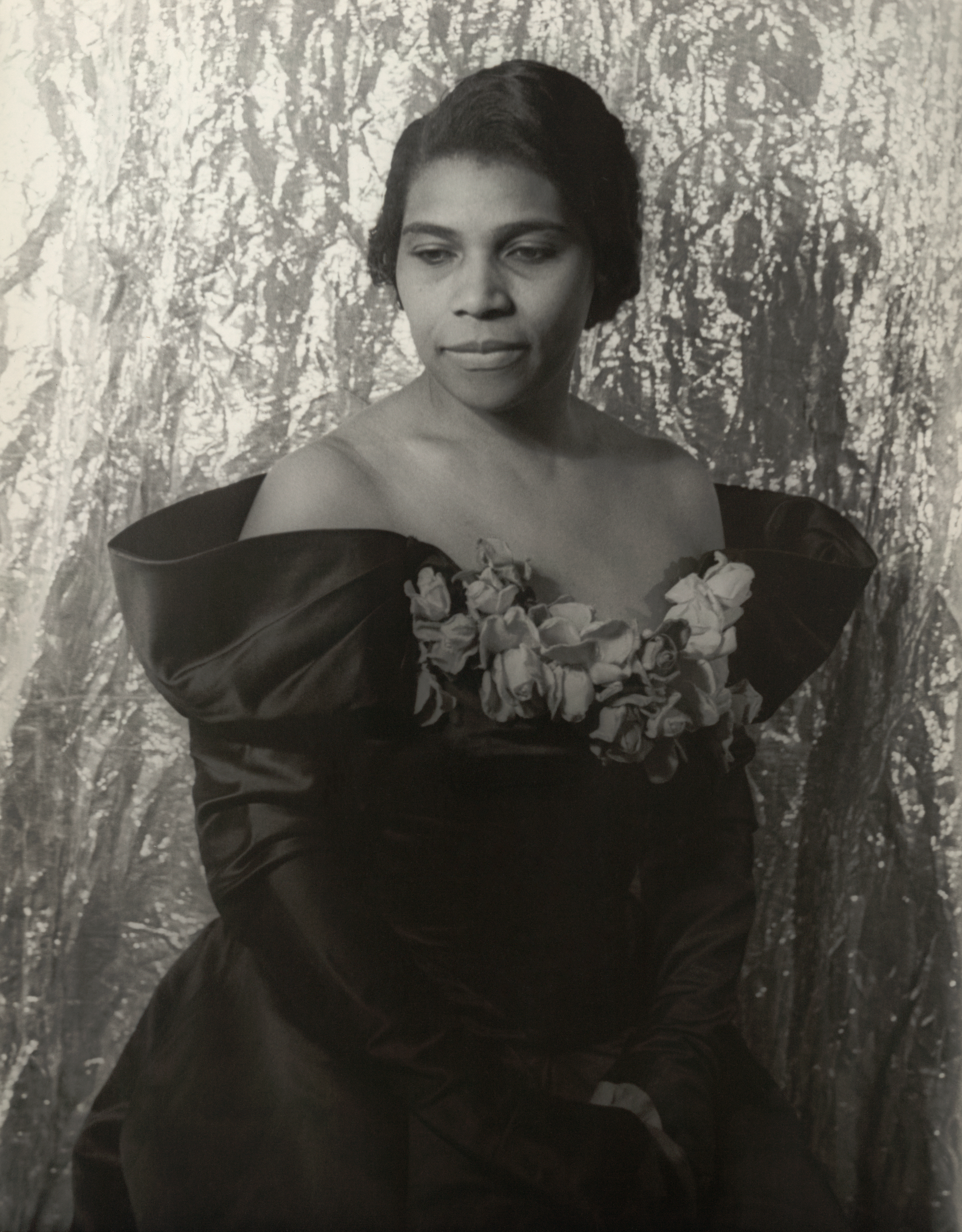
American contralto Marian Anderson, one of the most famous singers of the 20th century

British contralto Dame Clara Butt

- Eunice Alberts (1927–2012)
- Marietta Alboni (1823–1894)
- Marian Anderson (1897–1993)
- Fanny Anitúa (1887–1968)
- Cecil Arden (1894–1989)
- Germaine Bailac (1881–1977)
- Fedora Barbieri (1920–2003)
- Eula Beal (1919–2008)
- Marianne Brandt (1842–1921)
- Karin Branzell (1891–1974)
- Muriel Brunskill (1899–1980)
- Clara Butt (1872–1936)
- AnnaMaria Cardinalli (born 1979)
- Marie-Louise Cébron-Norbens (1888–1958)
- Lili Chookasian (1921–2012)
- Belle Cole (1845 or 1853–1905)
- Kate Condon (1877–1941)
- Clorinda Corradi (1804–1877)
- Christine Nielson Dreier (1866–1926)
- Kathleen Ferrier (1912–1953)
- Maureen Forrester (1930–2010)
- Delphine Galou (born 1977)
- Anna Girò (circa 1710 or 1711–1748 or later)
- Louise Homer (1871–1947)
- Edna Indermaur (1892–1985)
- Jenny Twitchell Kempton (1835–1921)
- Gillian Knight (born 1934)
- Anna Larsson (born 1966)
- Marie-Nicole Lemieux (born 1975)
- Gisela Litz (1922–2017)
- Louise Kirkby Lunn (1873–1930)

== M–Z ==
- Adelaide Malanotte (1785–1832)
- Bernadette Manca di Nissa (born 1954)
- Marietta Marcolini (c. 1780–1855)
- Margaret Matzenauer (1881–1963), who sang mostly mezzo-soprano roles though
- Antonia Merighi (died 1764)
- Sara Mingardo (born 1961)
- Sigrid Onégin (1889–1943)
- Rosmunda Pisaroni (1793–1872)
- Ewa Podleś (1952–2024)
- Marie Powers (1902–1973)
- Sonia Prina (born 1975)
- Maria Radner (1981—2015)
- Geltrude Righetti (1793–1862)
- Anastasia Robinson (c. 1692–1755)
- Sofia Scalchi (1850–1922)
- Ernestine Schumann-Heink (1861–1936)
- Annice Sidwells (1902–2001)
- Monica Sinclair (1925–2002)
- Nathalie Stutzmann (born 1965)
- Hilary Summers
- Vittoria Tesi (1700–1775)
- Kerstin Thorborg (1896–1970)
- Claramae Turner (1920–2013)
- Francesca Vanini-Boschi (?–1744)
- Lucia Elizabeth Vestris (1797–1856)
- Helen Watts (1927–2009)
- Portia White (1911–1968)
- Marta Wittkowska (1882–1977)

== See also ==
- Chronological list of operatic sopranos
- List of contraltos in non-classical music
