= Mary Le Ravin =

African-American visionary artist

- Born: 1905; Natchez, Mississippi
- Died: September 1992 (aged 86–87)
- Education: Self-taught
- Occupations: Visual artist, healer, preacher
- Spouse: Louis Le Ravin (m. 1927)
- Writing career
- Genres: Visionary art, Outsider art

Mary Le Ravin (1905 – September 1992) was an African American visionary artist and ordained minister. She was a self-taught artist best known for creating sculptures, jewelry, household items and trinkets out of animal bones, natural materials, and other found objects.

== Life and work ==
Le Ravin was born Mary Cooper in Natchez, Mississippi and grew up in Jefferson County, Mississippi. She reported being very spiritual and in direct communication with God from a very young age. She told the story of being "showered" by the Holy Spirit while sitting on her porch during a thunderstorm. In another telling of this event, which took place when she was between five and seven years old, a fish fell from the sky and provided her family's dinner that night. Ecstatic experiences informed Le Ravin's early religious life and lifelong ministry. She began collecting bones in childhood.

At the age of 16, she met her future husband, Louis Le Ravin, while working as a babysitter for a Creole theatre family in Monroe, Louisiana. Louis, the mixed-race son of a white father and black mother, belonged to a prosperous Creole class Mary had not been exposed to before leaving Mississippi. Despite Louis being 14 years Mary's senior, Mary fell in love with him during their fishing trips together. They married in 1927.

=== Becoming an artist ===
The couple moved to Gary, Indiana around 1936 or 1937 as part of the Great Migration, and Louis went to work in the city's steel mills. Mary ran a boarding house and engaged with church work, first in Baptist churches where she was prohibited from taking on any leadership role due to her gender, then as a Jehovah's Witness. After becoming a Jehovah's Witness, Le Ravin's evangelical efforts took her traveling throughout the U.S. South and Midwest.

Though she had made bone trinkets starting in the 1940s, Le Ravin only began creating her art in earnest after her husband's 1956 death in a steel mill accident. Because Louis was light-skinned enough to pass as white and his coworkers had never met her by the time of his death, they were shocked to learn Louis' wife was a Black woman when she came in to sign the papers claiming her husband's pension. After Louis' death, a devastated Le Ravin more consciously engaged the spirit world, especially through dreaming and deep sleep. When one of her tenants reported someone had attempted to break into the house one night, she prayed and heard the Holy Spirit instructing her to create "bone art" as a way of deterring prowlers.

=== Later years ===
In 1968, after being called racial slurs at the county fair in Gary, where she won several art competitions, Le Ravin moved to Los Angeles to be near her sister, Sarah. By the time Le Ravin ended up in California she was an ordained minister. As Mother Mary, she procured free use of a storefront in an area, near the University of Southern California, that housed many black-owned businesses. From this location, she set up an all-in-one thrift shop, art studio, and kitchen for feeding the poor and homeless. Folklorist Daniel Wojcik called this space, where Le Ravin ministered to the people of the neighborhood, a "storefront church".

Thus, Le Ravin earned the nickname "47th Street Mama". After some time performing this charitable work, God told her to "Stop feeding them and start preaching". Due to the 1987 Whittier Narrows earthquake and her declining health, Le Ravin was forced to leave her storefront space, abandoning many unfinished sculptures, barrels of bones, and other materials.

Le Ravin regularly displayed and sold her art at local events such as the Los Angeles Street Scene and annual Black Pride Parade. The most significant exhibition of Le Ravin's art career happened during the end of her life when, in 1991, the John Michael Kohler Arts Center, in Sheboygan, Wisconsin, exhibited over 150 of her works alongside those of Simon Sparrow and Norbert Kox in a show called Religious Visionaries. The John Michael Kohler Arts Center retains some of Le Ravin's works as part of its permanent collection.

== Artistic style ==
Le Ravin's religious art reflected her Christian beliefs, personal engagement with the Holy Spirit, and her dreams. She created many articulated puppet dolls who could be made to move like the Holy Ghost. Using her "God-given glue", a mix of Elmer's glue and sawdust, Le Ravin made sculptures and tableaux assembled from bones, beads, glitter, stones, shells, flowers, gum, container lids, plastic wrap, and other natural materials and found objects. She reported that the Holy Spirit guided her to see all sorts of shapes and faces in bones and often focused on religious subjects like Jesus and the Virgin Mary.

Most of her works, however, depicted African and African American pop cultural icons and historical figures, such as Nelson Mandela, Muhammad Ali, Diana Ross, Joe Louis, Mr. T., Michael Jackson, and Flip Wilson as well as characters like "a California Black Panther", interracial couples, The Black Mona Lisa and The Zulu Girl with the Blue Hair. In Black Hunger: Soul Food in America, Le Ravin is listed alongside Robert Colescott and Joyce Scott as an African American artist "appropriator" of Aunt Jemima. Her themes have also been described as touching on "racism, rape, homelessness, the struggles of women, and other forms of social injustice."

Le Ravin described her own art as "African bone art" and explained her use of bones in both symbolic and practical terms. For Le Ravin, bones represented the sacred cycle of life, death, and rebirth. In addition to her perception of bones as spiritual objects, their ready availability also made them a practical medium to work with. Le Ravin once said, "I imagine the Lord gave me bones to work with because I could easily get them from the food I ate." Her process, which she claimed to have received directly through her spiritual visions, involved boiling and bleaching bones, drilling and running wire through them, and, finally, arranging them for painting and adornment.

Though Le Ravin reported being accused of practicing witchcraft and voodoo, she found justification for her sacred view and use of bones in the Book of Ezekiel (37:1-10) wherein dry bones are breathed back to life. In response to her critics, she replied, "There was nothing wrong with those bones when they had meat on them and you were chewing on them, and now I took those bones and cleaned them, so what could be wrong with them now?"

== Exhibits ==
1990 Cavin Morris Gallery, New York City, NY

1990 The African Marketplace, Rancho Cienega Park, Los Angeles, CA

1990 William Grant Still Community Arts Center, Los Angeles, CA

1991 Religious Visionaries, John Michael Kohler Arts Center, Sheboygan, Wisconsin

1992 Religious Visionaries: Simon Sparrow/Mary Le Ravin. Carl Hammer Gallery, Chicago, IL
