= Tuixent – la Vansa =

Ski resort in Catalonia

Tuixent-La Vansa
- Interactive map of Tuixent-La Vansa
- Nearest city: Tuixent, Catalonia
- Coordinates: 42°13′22″N 1°32′18″E
- Top elevation: 2,150 metres (7,050 ft)
- Base elevation: 1,830 metres (6,000 ft)
- Trails: Nordic skiing Black circuit: 10 km Red circuit : 13 km Blue circuit: 7.5 km Green circuit: 1.8 km Skating circuit: 3.5 km
- Website: website

Tuixent-La Vansa is a ski resort for Nordic skiing in Josa i Tuixén and la Vansa i Fórnols, Catalonia, opened in 1978. It is located in the northern face of the Port del Comte range, from l'Arp at 1,830 metres (6,000 ft) to Prat Llong at 2,150 metres (7,050 ft), between the municipalities of Josa i Tuixén and la Vansa i Fórnols, so the resort name include both. It borders the Cadí-Moixeró Natural Park.

There are 32.3 kilometres (20.1 mi) of trails for cross-country skiing:

- Green circuit: 1.8 km
- Blue circuit: 7.5 km
- Red circuit: 13 km
- Black circuit: 10 km
- Skating circuit: 3.5 km
