= Agathe Plitt =

Agathe Plitt (1831 - 27 Dec 1902) was a German composer, pianist and teacher. She composed works for piano as well as cantatas, songs, motets, psalms and other choral pieces through at least opus 7. Her career was subsidized by Queen Elizabeth and Empress Augusta, both of Prussia.

Plitt was born in Torun (originally in Prussia; today in Poland). She first studied music in Danzig, where she was considered a child prodigy, then moved to Berlin in 1847. Queen Elizabeth of Prussia gave her a scholarship to study with Wilhelm Taubert. Beginning in 1852, she presented recitals throughout Germany, including in Danzig, Elbing, Konigsberg and Homburg, where she performed with the singer Johanna Wagner. She also began to compose during this time. Composer Carl Friedrich Rungenhagen noted that "Agathe Plitt possesses a distinct talent for composition; her songs bear witness to deep emotional feeling.”

Many of Plitt’s concerts were charitable in nature, given at no cost to hospitals, child care centres, etc.. To support herself, Plitt taught piano and also directed a women’s choir. Towards the end of her life, Empress Augusta of Prussia provided her with a pension, reportedly in recognition of her charitable work which included over 50 concerts for the poor and sick.

Plitt’s compositions were published by Challier & Company, and included:

== Piano ==
- Three Mazurkas

== Vocal ==
- Above the Stars (for choir)
- “ Aria at the Grave”
- “ Easter Cantata”
- Easter Song (for choir and soloists)
- Lord, How Long (for choir)
- O Blessed Easter Days (for choir)
- “Wenn Zwei von Einander Scheiden,” opus 7 no. 2 (text by Heinrich Heine)
- Why Art Thou Cast Down (for choir)
