= Hans Borchsenius =

American politician (1832–1908)

Hans Borchsenius (September 19, 1832 – April 20, 1908) was an American politician and newspaperman.

== Biography ==
Hans Theodor Sophus Borchsenius was born at Næstved in Zealand, Denmark. His parents Carl Wilhelm Borchsenius (1803–1858) and Elisabeth Dorothea (Arneson) Borchsenius (1804–1839) never came to the United States. His father worked in the mercantile business in Denmark. Borchsenius received his educational training at the Nestved high school and academy. In 1856, he sailed for the US arriving in July at Madison, Wisconsin. In Denmark, he had been in the same business as his father, but in the US, he struggled with the new language. For several months he ran the mail stage between Madison and Portage. He felt that the best means of accomplishing his object was to learn a trade, so he served an apprenticeship at the Norwegian language newspaper The Norwegian American (Den Norske Amerikaner), and soon afterward was able to purchase controlling interest in it, changing its name to the North Star (Nordstjernen). He maintained control of the newspaper until 1860, when it was absorbed by the Norwegian language Emigranten which was published by Carl Fredrik Solberg (1833–1924). Through his publication, he became interested in politics and in 1858 was the candidate of the Democratic Party for county clerk, being defeated by a small majority. General Lucius Fairchild and Wisconsin Associate Justice Silas U. Pinney were on the same ticket and were also defeated.

In 1861, Borchsenius entered the United States Army as adjutant of the Fifteenth Wisconsin Infantry, but owing to severe illness, he resigned before the cessation of hostilities. Before entering the army, he changed his allegiance from the Democratic to the Republican party. After he returned from the war, Governor James T. Lewis, who was then Wisconsin Secretary of State, appointed him to clerkship in his office, from which he was transferred to the state land department where he served for five years. He was then elected county clerk of Dane County and served as such four years. He was then appointed United States Internal Revenue Gauger and served one year. He also purchased the Capital House hotel in Madison, which he ran from 1872 to 1874. Borchsenius attended law school in Madison and was admitted to the Dane County bar in 1876.

In 1875, when Harrison Ludington ran for state governor, Borchsenius published a campaign paper called The Wisconsin Banner, which was instrumental in electing both the governor and secretary of state on the Republican ticket. Governor Ludington then appointed Borchsenius timber agent for the state to protect the railroad lands on the Chippewa and Red Cedar rivers. While serving in this capacity, he became interested in northern Wisconsin and in 1877 he moved to Baldwin, to engage in the real estate and loan business. While residing in Baldwin, he was twice elected president of the village. He was also elected chairman of the county board. In 1891, President Benjamin Harrison appointed Borchsenius chief of the Internal Revenue Service in the Treasury Department, in which capacity he served until President Grover Cleveland was elected. In 1896, Borchsenius was elected a member of the Wisconsin State Assembly from St. Croix County intending that this should be his last political office. At the end of his legislative term, Borchsenius retired from active life and returned to Madison to live, building the home.

== Personal life ==
On November 10, 1859, he married Martha Marie Bakke (1841–1927). She was born in Christiana, Norway. They had three children: William Carl, Dora H., and George Valdemar, who served as clerk of the United States court in Alaska. Borchsenius identified with the Lutheran Church. At his death in 1908, he was buried at Forest Hill Cemetery in Dane County, Wisconsin.

== Bibliography ==
- Keyes, Elisha Williams (1906). History of Dane County: Biographical and Genealogical (Public domain ed.). Western Historical Association. p. 103.

== Related reading ==
- Lovoll, Odd Sverre (2010) Norwegian Newspapers in America: Connecting Norway and the New Land (Minnesota Historical Society) ISBN 9780873517966
