= Contralto =

Low-pitched female singing voice

A contralto (Italian pronunciation: [konˈtralto]) (sometimes alto) is a classical female singing voice whose vocal range is the lowest of such voice types.

The contralto voice type is fairly rare. A contralto's range is similar to that of a mezzo-soprano, and almost identical to that of a countertenor – typically from the F below middle C (F_{3} in scientific pitch notation) to the second F above middle C (F_{5}), although, at the extremes, some voices can reach the D below middle C (D_{3}) or the second B♭ above middle C (B♭_{5}). The contralto voice type includes coloratura, lyric, and dramatic contraltos.

== History ==
"Contralto" is primarily meaningful only in reference to classical and operatic singing, as other traditions lack a comparable system of vocal categorization. The term "contralto" is only applied to female singers; men singing in a similar range are called "countertenors". The Italian terms "contralto" and "alto" are not synonymous, "alto" technically denoting a specific vocal range in choral singing without regard to factors like tessitura, vocal timbre, vocal facility, and vocal weight. However, there exists some French choral writing (including that of Ravel and Poulenc) with a part labelled "contralto", despite the tessitura and function being that of a classical alto part. The Saracen princess Clorinde in André Campra's 1702 opera Tancrède was written for Julie d'Aubigny and is considered the earliest major role for bas-dessus or contralto voice.

== Vocal range ==
Contralto vocal range (F_{3}–F_{5}) notated on the treble staff (left) and on piano keyboard in green with dot marking middle C (C_{4})

The contralto has the lowest vocal range of the female voice types, with the lowest tessitura; it is between tenor and mezzo-soprano.

Although tenors, baritones, and basses are male singers, some women can sing as low (albeit with a slightly different timbre and texture) as their male counterparts. Some of the rare female singers who specialized in the tenor and baritone registers include film actress Zarah Leander, the Iranian āvāz singer Hayedeh, the child prodigy Ruby Helder (1890–1938), and Bavarian novelty singer Bally Prell. The Guinness World Record for lowest note by a female is D_{2}, by Helen Leahey.

== Subtypes and roles in opera ==
Ada Florence singing I'm called Little Buttercup from H.M.S. Pinafore

Within the contralto voice type category are three generally recognized subcategories: coloratura contralto, an agile voice specializing in florid passages; lyric contralto, a voice lighter in timbre; and dramatic contralto, a deep, dark, and bold contralto voice.

The coloratura contralto was a favorite voice type of Rossini's. Many of his roles listed below were written with this type of voice in mind. Lyric contraltos are heavily utilized in both the French and English operatic repertoire. Many of the Gilbert and Sullivan contralto roles are best suited with a lyric contralto voice. Ma Moss in The Tender Land is a notable lyric contralto role. The dramatic contralto voice is heard in much of the German operatic repertoire. Erda in Der Ring des Nibelungen and Gaea in Daphne are both good examples of the dramatic contralto.

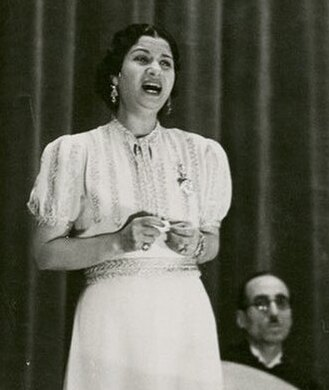
Umm Kulthum, a well known contralto. She had the ability to sing as low as the second octave and as high as the eighth octave at her vocal peak.

True operatic contraltos are rare, and the operatic literature contains few roles written specifically for them with most of those roles singing notes outside of their defined range. Contraltos sometimes are assigned feminine roles like Teodata in Flavio, Angelina in La Cenerentola, Rosina in The Barber of Seville, Isabella in L'italiana in Algeri, and Olga in Eugene Onegin, but more frequently they play female villains or trouser roles. Contraltos may also be cast in roles originally written for castrati. A common saying among contraltos is that they may play only "witches, bitches, or britches."

Examples of contralto roles in the standard operatic repertoire include the following:

- Angelina^{*}, La Cenerentola (Rossini)
- Arnalta, L'incoronazione di Poppea (Monteverdi)
- Arsace, Semiramide (Rossini)
- Art Banker, Facing Goya (Nyman)
- Azucena^{*}, Il trovatore (Verdi)
- Auntie^{*}, landlady of The Boar, Peter Grimes (Britten)
- The Baroness, Vanessa (Barber)
- Bradamante, Alcina (Handel)
- La Cieca, La Gioconda (Ponchielli)
- Cornelia, Giulio Cesare (Handel)
- The Countess^{*}, The Queen of Spades (Tchaikovsky)
- Didone, Egisto (Cavalli)
- Dryade, Ariadne auf Naxos (Strauss)
- Erda, Das Rheingold, Siegfried (Wagner)
- Felicia, Il crociato in Egitto (Meyerbeer)
- Madame Flora (Baba), The Medium (Menotti)
- Fidès, Le prophète (Meyerbeer)
- Florence Pike, Albert Herring (Britten)
- Gaea, Daphne (Strauss)
- Geneviève, Pelléas et Mélisande (Debussy)
- Griselda, Griselda (Vivaldi)
- Hélène Bezukhova, War and Peace (Prokofiev)
- Hippolyta, A Midsummer Night's Dream (Britten)
- Isabella^{*}, L'italiana in Algeri (Rossini)
- Katisha, The Mikado (Gilbert and Sullivan)
- Klytemnestra^{*}, Elektra (Richard Strauss)
- Lel, The Snow Maiden (Rimsky-Korsakov)
- Little Buttercup, H.M.S. Pinafore (Gilbert and Sullivan)
- Lucretia, The Rape of Lucretia (Britten)
- Maddalena^{*}, Rigoletto (Verdi)
- Magdelone, Maskarade (Nielsen)
- Mamma Lucia, Cavalleria rusticana (Mascagni)
- Ma Moss, The Tender Land (Copland)
- Malcolm^{*}, La donna del lago (Rossini)
- Margret, Wozzeck (Berg)
- Maria, Porgy and Bess (Gershwin)
- The Marquise of Berkenfield, La fille du régiment (Donizetti)
- Marthe, Faust (Gounod)
- Marilyn Klinghoffer, The Death of Klinghoffer (Adams)
- Mary, Der fliegende Holländer (Wagner)
- Miss Todd, The Old Maid and the Thief (Menotti)
- Mother, The Consul (Menotti)
- Mother Goose, Mother Goose (Felix Jarrar)
- Mother Goose, The Rake's Progress (Stravinsky)
- Mrs. Noye, Noye's Fludde (Britten)
- Mrs. Prin, Tabula Rasa (Felix Jarrar)
- Mistress Quickly, Falstaff (Verdi)
- Norn (I), Götterdämmerung (Wagner)
- Oberon, A Midsummer Night's Dream (Britten) (score calls for contralto or countertenor)
- Olga^{*}, Eugene Onegin (Tchaikovsky)
- Orfeo, Orfeo ed Euridice (Gluck) (originally for castrato)
- Orlando, Orlando Furioso (Vivaldi)
- Orsini, Lucrezia Borgia (Donizetti)
- Polina, The Queen of Spades (Tchaikovsky)
- Preziosilla, La Forza del Destino (Verdi)
- Ratmir, Ruslan and Lyudmila (Glinka)
- Rosina^{*}, The Barber of Seville (Rossini)
- Rosmira/Eurimene^{*}, Partenope (Handel)
- Ruth, The Pirates of Penzance (Gilbert and Sullivan)
- Schwertleite, Die Walküre (Wagner)
- Smeaton, Anna Bolena (Donizetti)
- Sosostris, The Midsummer Marriage (Tippett)
- Stella, What Next? (Carter)
- Tancredi, Tancredi (Rossini)
- Ulrica, Un ballo in maschera (Verdi)
- Widow Begbick^{*}, Rise and Fall of the City of Mahagonny (Weill)
- 3rd Woodsprite, Rusalka (Dvořák)
- La Zia Principessa, Suor Angelica (Puccini)
- Zita, Gianni Schicchi (Puccini)

^{*} indicates a role that may also be sung by a mezzo-soprano.

== See also ==
- Category of contraltos
- Fach, the German system for classifying voices
- List of contraltos in non-classical music
- List of operatic contraltos
- Voice classification in non-classical music
