= Josa i Tuixén =

- Municipality
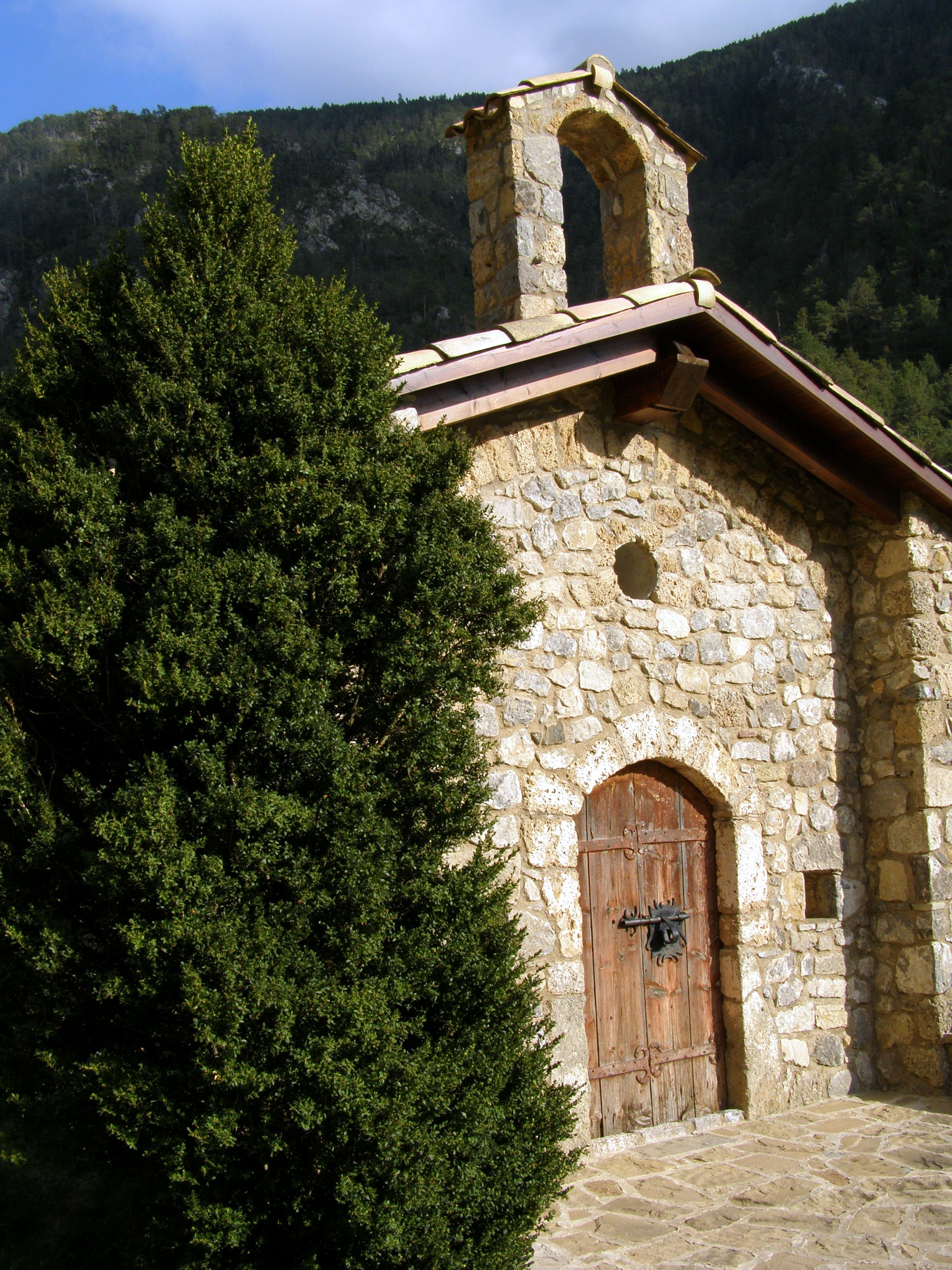
- St. James's church, Tuixén

- Flag Coat of arms

- Location in Catalonia
- Coordinates: 42°13′59″N 1°34′5″E
- Country: Spain
- Community: Catalonia
- Province: Lleida
- Comarca: Alt Urgell

Government
  - Mayor: Marta Poch Massegú (2015)

Area
  - Total: 68.2 km^{2} (26.3 sq mi)
- Elevation: 1,206 m (3,957 ft)

Population (2025-01-01)
  - Total: 110
  - Density: 1.6/km^{2} (4.2/sq mi)
- Demonym(s): josenc, josenca tuixentí, tuixentina
- Website: tuixent.ddl.net

Josa i Tuixén (Catalan pronunciation: [ˈʒɔzaj tuˈʃen]) or Josa i Tuixent is a municipality in the comarca of the Alt Urgell in Catalonia, Spain. It is situated on the southern side of the Pyrenean range of Serra del Cadí in the east of the comarca. The ajuntament (town hall) is located in Tuixén. Local roads link the municipality with La Seu d'Urgell and with Sant Llorenç de Morunys. It is a centre for Nordic skiing. It has a population of 110 (register office, 2025).

== Subdivisions ==
As the name suggests, the municipality of Josa i Tuixén comprises two villages that were two independent municipalities until 1973. Populations are given as of 2013:

- Josa de Cadí - 25
- Tuixent - 116

== Demography ==
1900	1930	1950	1970	1986	2007
537	356	288	180	134	172
