= Helen Leahey =

Welsh singer and voiceover artist

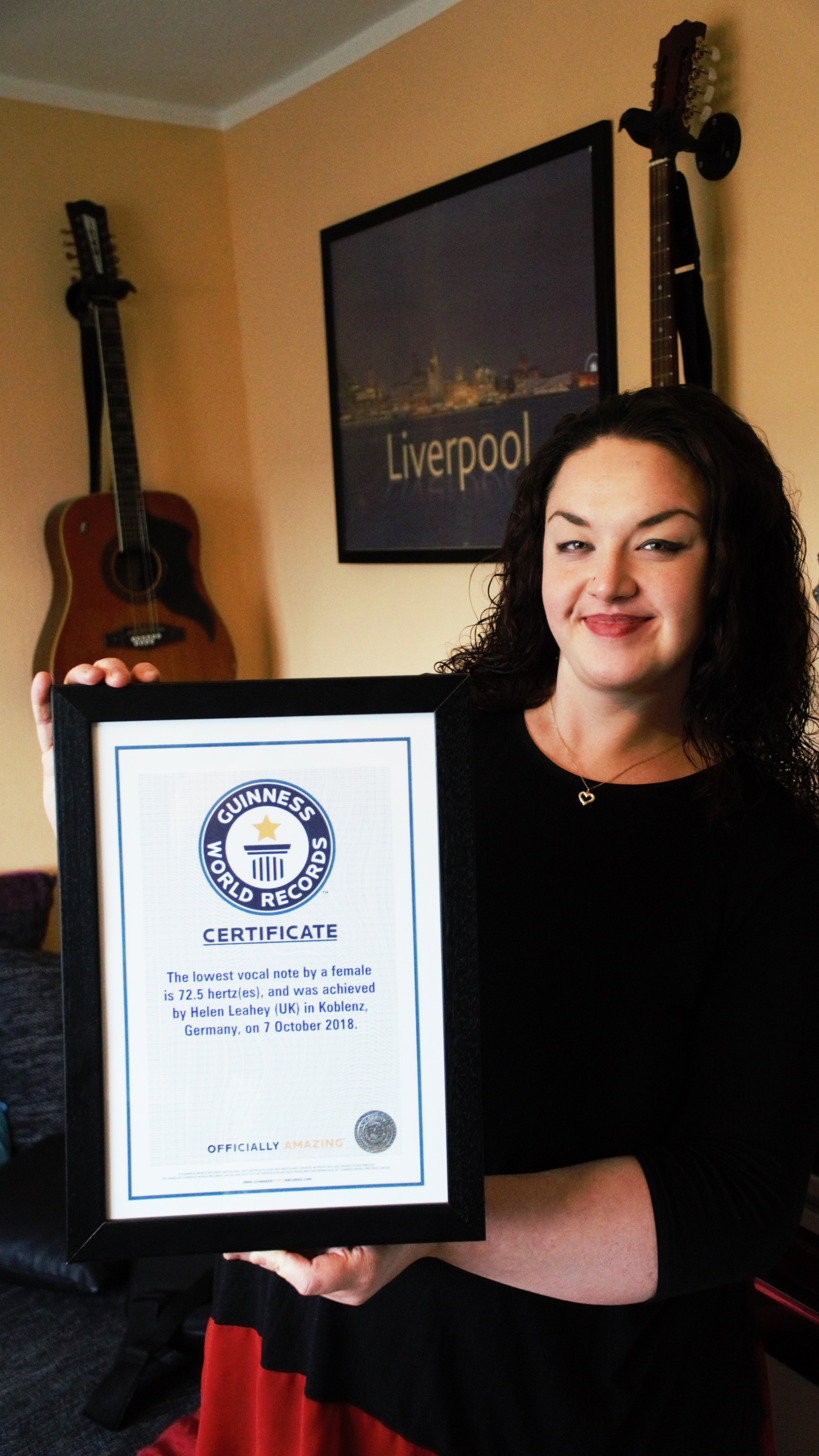
- Pronunciation: Leehei
- Born: 4 October 1987 (age 39); St. Asaph, Wales, UK
- Occupation: Singer/Voice Over Artist
- Years active: 2017 - present
- Known for: Guinness World Word Record 'Lowest Vocal Note by a Female'
- Television: The Voice Germany (2017) The Voice UK (2022)
- Children: 1
- Website: www.helenleahey.com

Helen Francesca Leahey (born 4 October 1987) is a Welsh musician and voiceover artist who is notable for her deep voice. She is the first Guinness World Record holder (2018) for 'Lowest Vocal Note by a Female'. In 2017 she appeared on The Voice of Germany and in 2022 The Voice UK. In 2023, Leahey was the primary source for the demon in the movie The Exorcist: Believer.

Leahey owns her own music label 'Deintra' and has recorded three albums to date: Train Tracks (2020), Auf Wiedersehen (2020) and Spirits (2020).

== Career ==
Supervising sound editor Rich Bologna explained the sculpting of the supernatural sound for the movie The Exorcist: Believer and Leahey's part in it:

"The demon in the film is a woman, so David [Gordon Green] found this great voice actor, a Welsh woman named Helen Leahey, who lives in Cologne, Germany. So we did a preliminary recording session with her even before there was a working cut of the film. She recorded some amazing stuff. Because she speaks Welsh, she did a version of the Welsh National Anthem backward. She transcribed it backward phonetically, and then performed it. We were all blown away. What a first impression! We used most of her performance for the demon voice, and David also hired an additional voice actor J. Moliere. But her voice is the primary source."

The original demon voice for the 1973 horror film The Exorcist was recorded by Oscar winner Mercedes McCambridge.

== Early life and education ==
Leahey was born in St. Asaph, Wales, UK to Liverpudlian Charles Joseph Leahey and Dr. Christiane Ulmer-Leahey (née Ulmer) from Mainz, Germany. She is of English, Irish, Welsh, Scottish, Sardinian, Scandinavian and German descent. Her father was a musician and her mother is a retired school director and published author.

Leahey completed her Bachelor in History and Irish Studies at the University of Liverpool (2010) and her Master in International Journalism at Falmouth University (2012). During her studies and afterwards, Leahey became a member of various Irish folk bands and finally founded the music project DILLIGARA where she collaborates with various artists. Before going into higher education Leahey studied a BTEC in Performing Arts at the former Yale College, Wrexham, Wales.
