= Wilhelm Taubert =

German pianist, composer and conductor (1811–1891)

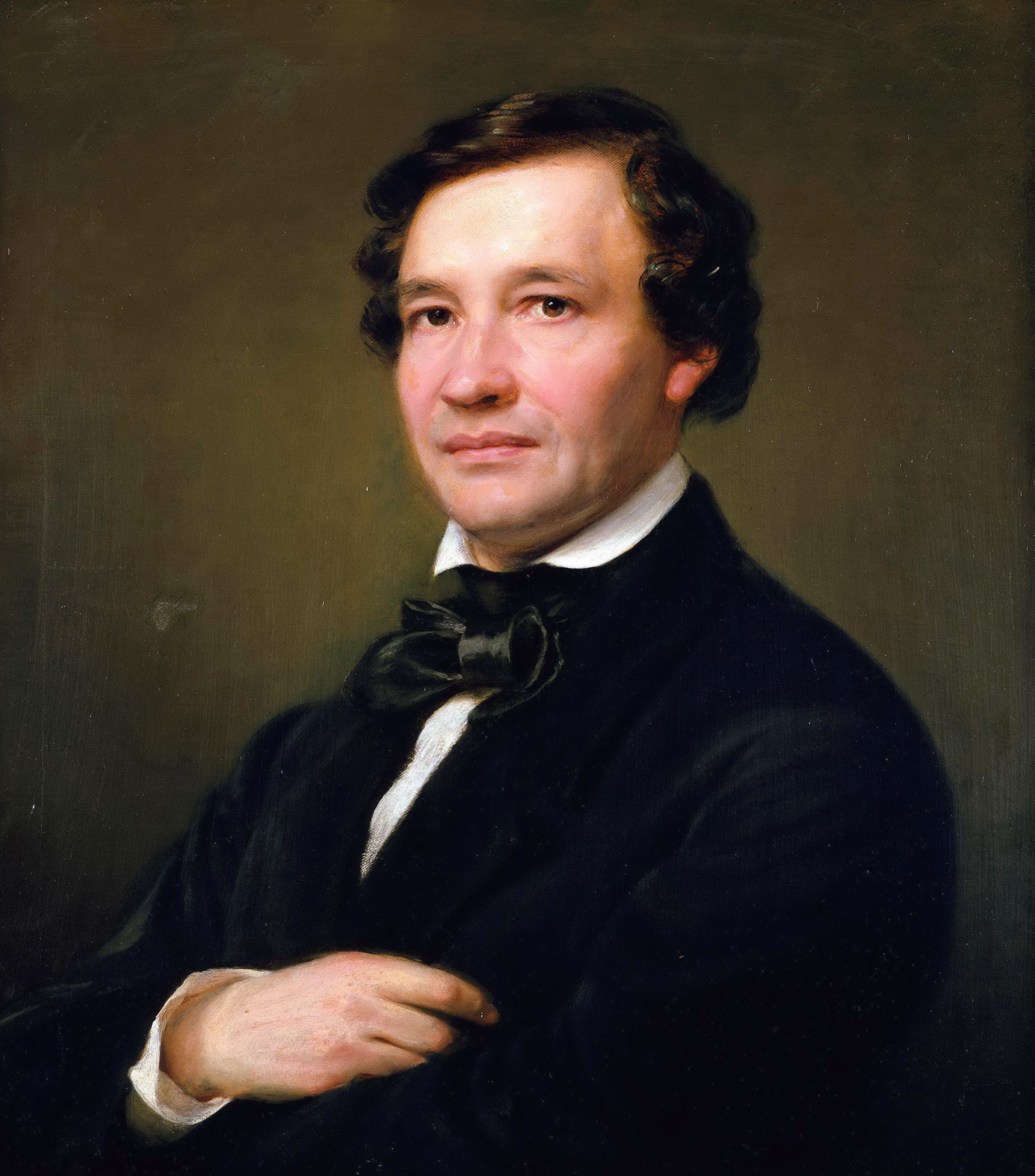
Wilhelm Taubert in 1862.

Carl Gottfried Wilhelm Taubert (23 March 1811 – 7 January 1891) was a German pianist, composer, and conductor, and the father of philologist and writer Emil Taubert.

== Life ==
Born in Berlin, Taubert studied under Ludwig Berger (piano) and Bernhard Klein (composition). In 1831, he became assistant conductor and accompanist for Berlin court concerts. Between 1845 and 1848, he was music director of the Berlin Royal Opera and was also court conductor in Berlin from 1845 to 1869. From 1865, he taught music at the Prussian Academy of Arts; his pupils included Theodor Kullak and Agathe Plitt.

His compositions include six operas, incidental music, four symphonies, concertos for piano and cello, four string quartets, other orchestral, choral, and piano works, and more than 300 songs. His early compositions were praised by the composer Felix Mendelssohn, who had also studied piano with Berger.

Taubert died in Berlin. His grave is preserved in the Protestant "Friedhof I der Jerusalems- und Neuen Kirchengemeinde" (Cemetery No. I of the congregations of Jerusalem's Church and New Church) in Berlin-Kreuzberg, south of Hallesches Tor.

== Operas ==
- Die Kirmes, comic opera, libretto by Eduard Devrient, 23 January 1832, Berlin, Königliches Theater
- Die Zigeuner, libretto by E. Devrient, 14 September 1834, Berlin, Königliches Theater
- Marquis und Dieb, comic opera, libretto by L Schneider, 15 February 1842, Berlin, Königliches Theater
- Joggeli, libretto by H. Kloster, 9 October 1953, Berlin, Königliches Theater
- Macbeth, libretto by F. H. Eggers, 16 November 1857, Berlin, Königliches Theater
- Caesario, oder Was ihr wollt, comic opera, libretto by E. Taubert, 13 November 1874, Berlin, Königliches Theater
