= Richard Ragsdale =

Dr. Richard Ragsdale (September 1, 1935 - October 23, 2004) was a physician who performed abortions in Illinois. Ragsdale opened his Northern Illinois Women's Center in 1973, after the Roe v. Wade U.S. Supreme Court case striking down laws against abortion.

== Early life ==
Richard Ragsdale was born September 1, 1935, in Madison, Wisconsin, the son of Clarence and Marie (Zettler) Ragsdale. He attended the University of Wisconsin as an undergraduate, and received his medical degree from UW as well.

He served in the U.S. Air Force from 1966 to 1970, achieving the rank of lieutenant colonel.

== Ragsdale v. Turnock ==
Ragsdale filed suit against the state of Illinois regarding excessive and unnecessary requirements for ambulatory surgical clinics. The case reached the Supreme Court and was settled with an acceptance of some restriction.
