= George V. Borchsenius =

American attorney (1865–1945)

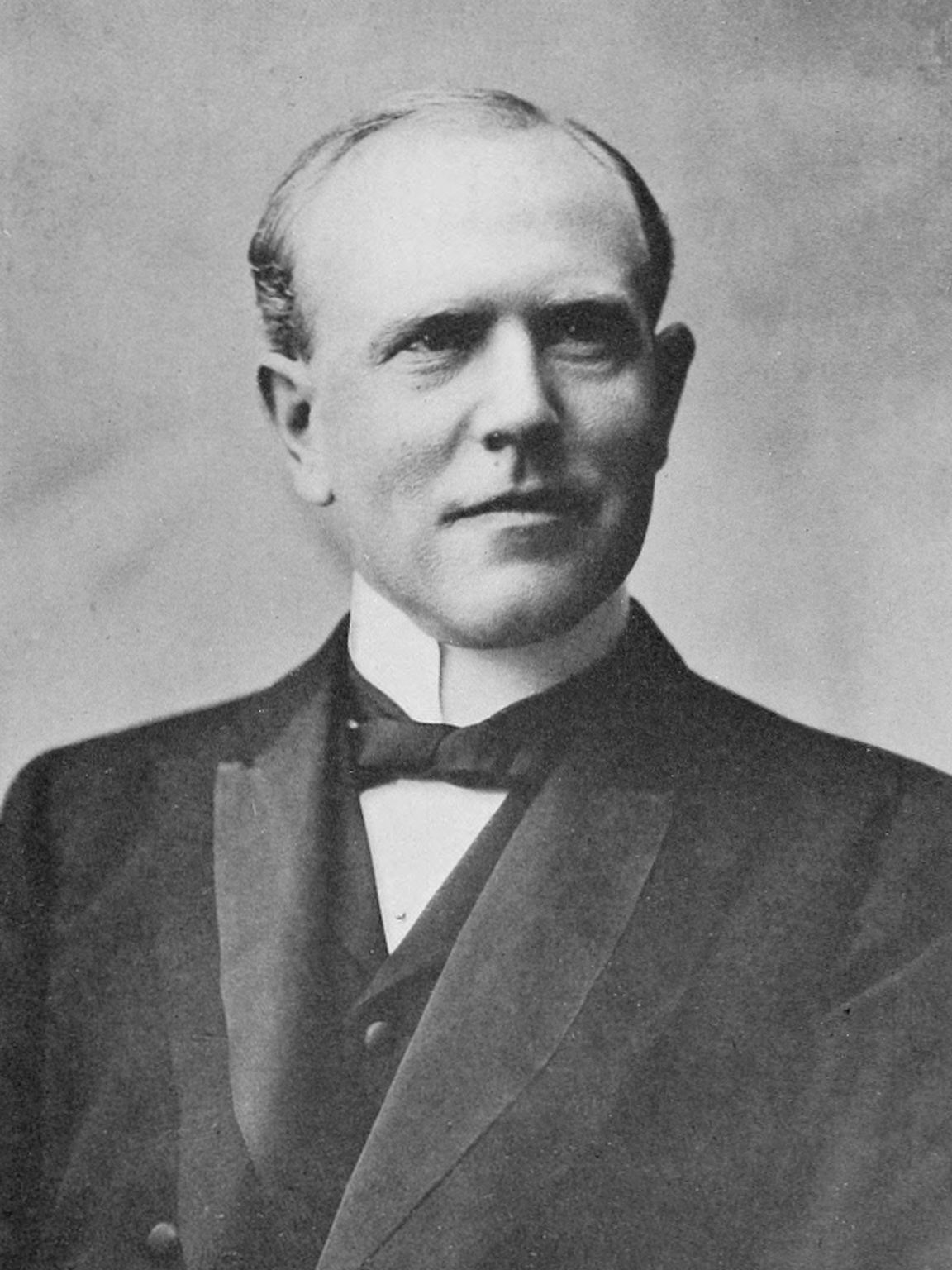
George Valdemar Borchsenius

George Valdemar Borchsenius (July 15, 1865 – September 10, 1945) was an American attorney. He was the first clerk of the court of the Nome judicial division of Alaska.

== Background ==
Borchsenius was born in Madison, Wisconsin. His father, Hans Borchsenius, was a Danish-born newspaperman and politician. His mother, Martha M. Bakke, was born in Norway, a daughter of Hans E. Bakke, of Copenhagen. He had a brother William Carl and a sister Dora H. When Borchsenius was 12 years old, he moved with his parents to Baldwin, Wisconsin. He attended the public schools of Wisconsin and subsequently was graduated from the law department of University of Wisconsin–Madison.

== Career ==
While a resident of Baldwin he learned the printers trade. At a later period, he engaged in the hardware and general mercantile business, and subsequently, with his father and brother, conducted a real estate and loan agency under the firm name of H. Borchsenius & Sons. In 1885, he returned to Madison and assisted in the compilation of the state census. Following the completion of this work, he was employed in the executive office by Governor Jeremiah McLain Rusk, and at a later date was connected with the land office.

In 1891, he returned to Baldwin, and for a period of four years was in the real estate and loan business. In 1895, he went back to Madison as assistant to the state treasurer. He was in Madison in 1899 when the reports of the Eldorado at Nome reached the states, and he determined to try his fortune in the newly discovered gold fields. In the spring of 1900, he received the appointment of Clerk of the U. S. District Court, and arrived in Nome and entered upon the discharge of his duties July 9.

In July 1901, he was retired by Arthur H. Noyes, (1854-1915) who had been appointed United States Federal Judge for the District of Alaska. In a fraudulent scheme to seize rich mining claims, Alexander McKenzie, Republican National Committeeman for North Dakota, had secured the appointment of his hand-picked candidates for the government positions, including that of federal judge. One year later, Borchsenius was re-appointed to the office by Judge Albert S. Moore of San Francisco. By 1904, was the only one of the first federal appointees in Nome who filled the office to which he was first appointed.

Borchsenius later acquired by purchase, considerable mining property in the vicinity of Nome, and expended near $25,000 in its development. He was the owner of No. 12 Anvil Creek and three benches adjoining and near the very rich Mattie claim. He owned or had a controlling interest in Specimen Gulch property from Anvil Creek to Summit Bench. Pay was not struck until 1904. Besides these properties Borchsenius owned some quartz claims between Rock and Lindblom Creeks.

== Personal life ==
September 14, 1887, Borchsenius and Lula M. Bockus were married in Baldwin. Harold, their only child, was born December 4, 1891. George Borchsenius died in Los Angeles in 1945.

== Bibliography ==
- Keyes, Elisha Williams (1906). History of Dane County: Biographical and Genealogical (Public domain ed.). Western Historical Association.
