= Tuixent =

Coordinates: 42.2328°N 1.5683°E

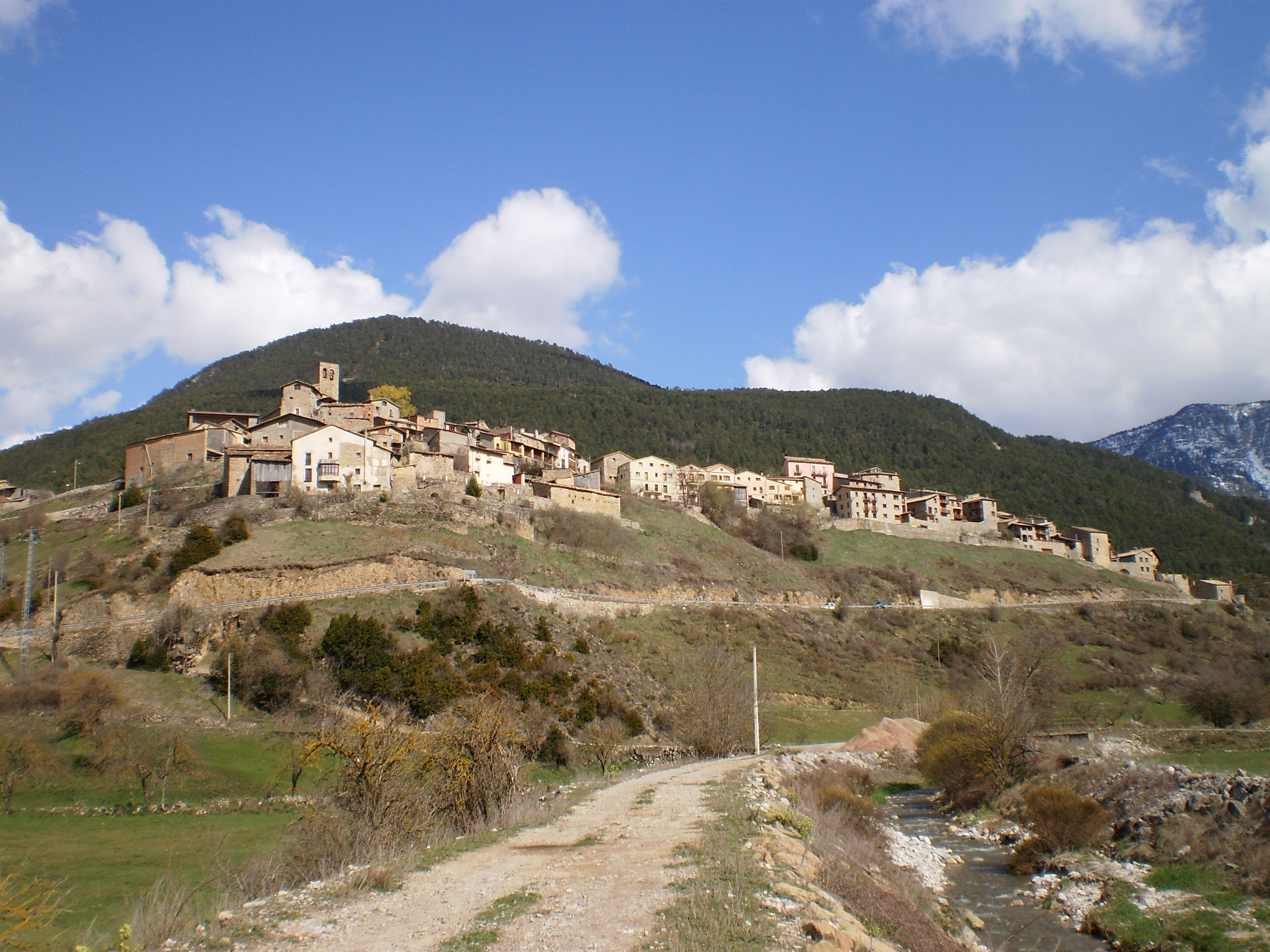
- Interactive map of Tuixent
- Elevation: 1,225 m (4,019 ft)

Tuixent (Catalan pronunciation: [tuˈʃen]) or Tuixén is a village in the municipality of Josa i Tuixén, in Catalonia, Spain, and an independent municipality until 1973, when it was merged with Josa de Cadí.

== Economy ==
It is a population traditionally dedicated to the primary sector, with exploitation of forests and livestock. The exploitation of pine (Pinus mugo subsp. uncinata) forests provided wealth to the municipality, despite the low price of the wood and the difficult access to some of the forests make its use unprofitable today. On the other hand, the progressive depopulation, the aging of the population and the lack of generational relief have significantly reduced livestock activity.

Currently, economic activity is very focused on the tertiary sector, especially tourism, restaurants, farmhouses and the Nordic ski resort of Tuixent – la Vansa.

== Culture ==
=== Architectural and artistic heritage ===
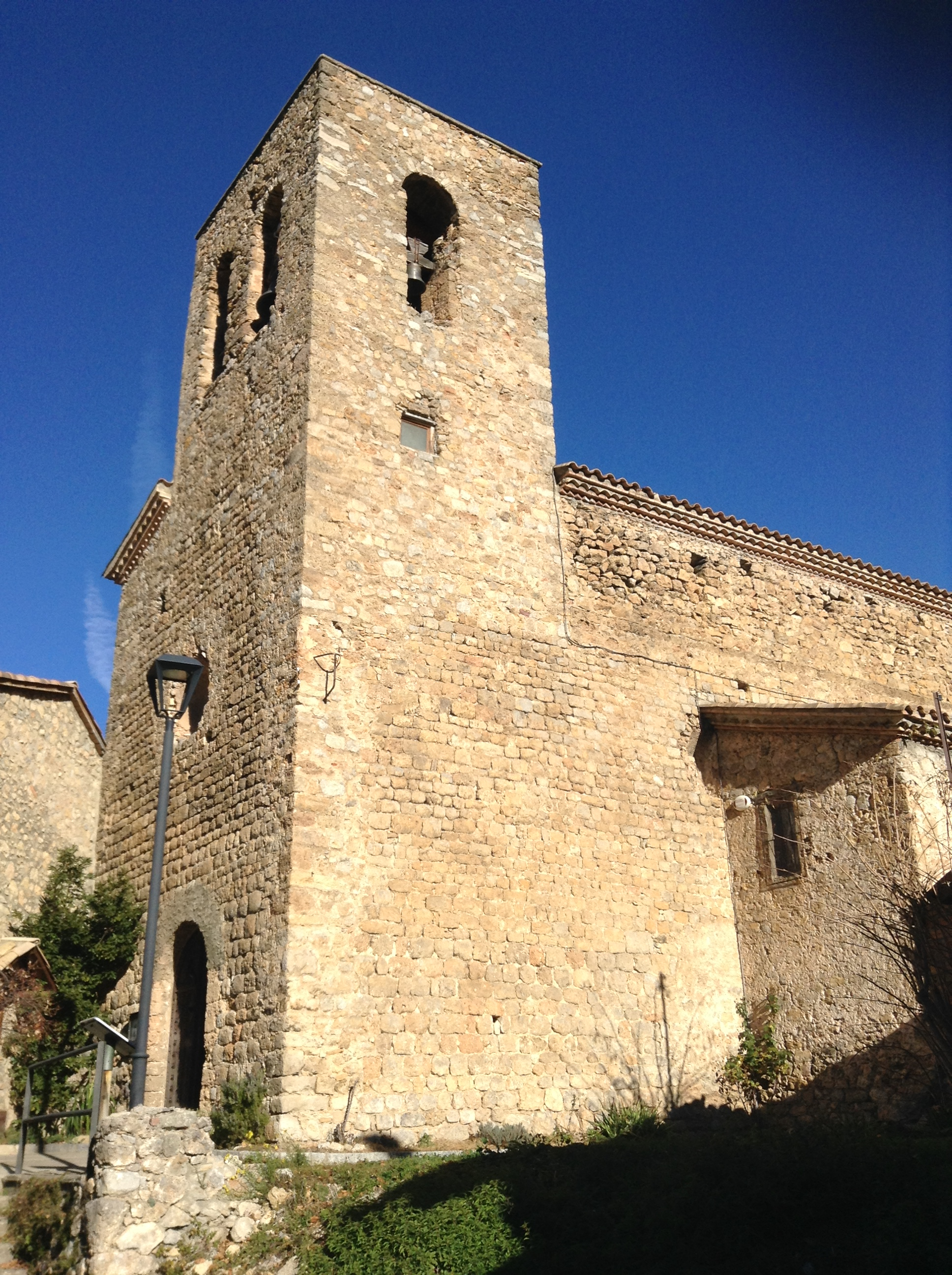
Sant Esteve de Tuixent

The parish church, of Romanesque origin from the 11th century and dedicated to saint Stephen, is located in the highest part of the town. The building has undergone numerous modifications, especially during the 19th century and stands out for the fact that the bell tower is not finished in a pointed shape, in contrast to most Romanesque churches in the area. This is due to the fire caused by the impact of lightning that fell at the beginning of the 20th century and which caused its disappearance. Inside the church there is a polychrome Romanesque carving of a Virgin that dates from the end of the twelfth century and an altarpiece dedicated to Saint Sebastian, from the end of the sixteenth century.

About 3 kilometers from the town, following the C-563 road to Josa and Gósol, there is the Romanesque hermitage of Sant Jaume, from the 11th or 12th century.

=== Museum of the Trementinaires ===
The Trementinaires museum, opened in 1998 and located on the ground floor of the town hall, explains the trade of the turpentine workers (trementinaires). This activity, practiced during the 19th and early 20th centuries by a significant number of the women of the village and other populations in the Vansa valley, consisted of the collection of plants, the preparation of remedies and their commercialization in a large part of the Catalan territory.

== Bibliography ==
- Obiols, Joan (2004). Tuixent, història, costums i gent [Tuixent, history, traditions and people] (in Catalan). ABADIA Editors. ISBN 84-96292-20-7.
