= Emil Taubert =

German philologist and writer (1844–1895)

Emil Taubert (23 January 1844 in Berlin – 10 April 1895 in Berlin) was a German philologist, writer and librettist. He was the son of composer Wilhelm Taubert and studied philology and philosophy at the Friedrich-Wilhelms University in his hometown. After completing his studies he got a job as a teacher at the Friedrich-Wilhelms-Gymnasium in Berlin.

The Franco-Prussian War of 1870–1871 made the military-logistic Taubert return to the teaching profession. In 1877, he became a senior teacher at the Königliche Lehrerinnen-Seminar, and nine years later he was promoted to Intendantur-Rat, a military administrative authority, at the Royal Theater. In addition to his day job he developed an extensive literary work over the years, which attracted considerable attention from the public and literary criticism. His final resting place is at the Friedhöfe vor dem Halleschen Tor in Berlin.

== Works ==
- Neue Gedichte (Berlin 1837)
- Gedichte (Berlin 1865)
- Jugendparadies, Gedichte für Jung und Alt (Berlin 1869)
- Juventas, Neue Dichtungen für Jung und Alt (Berlin 1869)
- König Rother, Episches Gedicht (Berlin 1883)
- Die Niobide, Novelle (Berlin 1884)
- Laurin, Ballet in 3 acts and 6 scenes (Berlin 1895)
