= Christine Nielson Dreier =

American singer

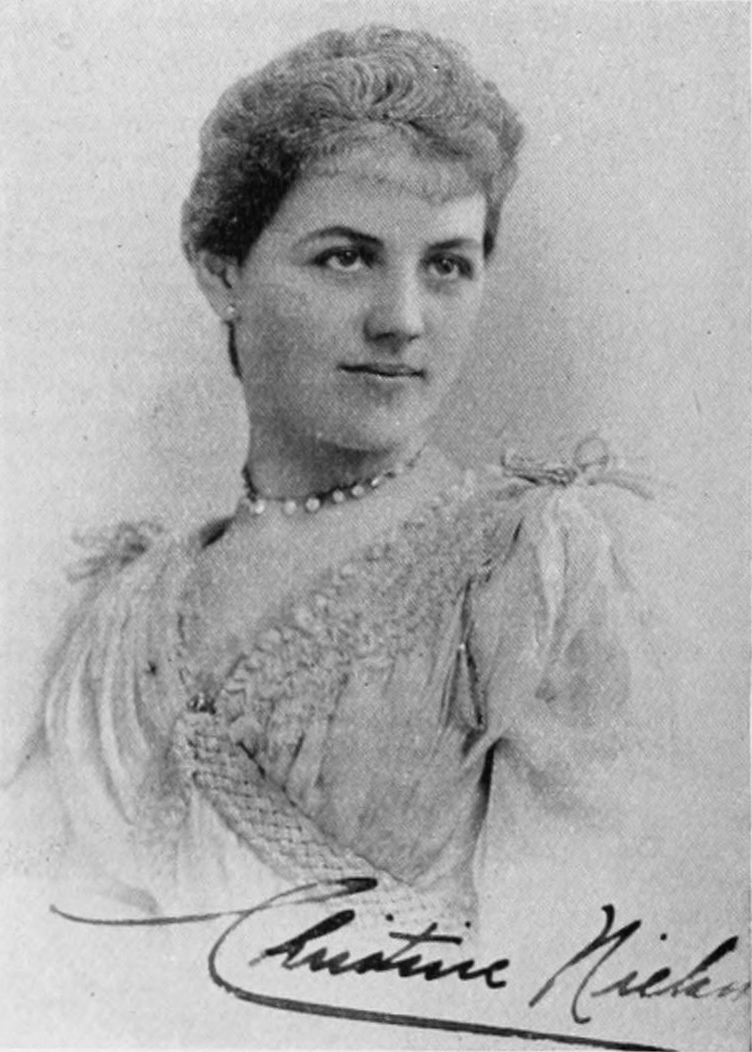
- Portrait from A Woman of the Century
- Born: Dorothea Christine Nielson; June 10, 1866; Madison, Wisconsin, U.S.
- Died: May 14, 1926 (aged 59); Chicago, Illinois, U.S.
- Other name: Christine Nielson
- Occupation: Contralto
- Spouse: Otto Albert Dreier (m. 1891)

Christine Nielson Dreier (née Dorothea Christine Nielson; stage name, Christine Nielson; June 10, 1866 – May 15, 1926) was an American concert and oratorio singer, a contralto of wide range. She was soloist in Chicago's First Presbyterian Church for 18 years. Dreier also performed at the Exposition Universelle (Paris, 1889) and the World's Columbian Exposition (Chicago, 1893).

== Early life and education ==
Dorothea Christine Nielson born in Madison, Wisconsin, June 10, 1866. Of Norwegian parentage, (Note: According to the Wisconsin Historical Society, Dreier was Danish.) the father was Andrew Nielson (1830–1897) and the mother was Cecilia (Baerntson) Nielson (1828–1894). Both parents were among the early Scandinavian immigrants to the U.S. and settled in Chicago in 1851, afterward removing to Madison. Dreier's siblings were: Carie (b. 1851), Nels (b. 1856), Bernhard (b. 1857), Andreas (b. 1860), Samuel (b. 1861), Bertha (b. 1863), Edward (b. 1869), and Lillie (b. 1873).

Dreier's first teacher, and the one to discover her capabilities, was Prof. T. A. Brand. She then studied with Mary J. De Moe (Mrs. Earl C. De Moe), herself a successful concert singer. Neilson began to sing in public at the age of thirteen, attracting, at an orphan's home concert in Madison, the attention of those whose foresight discovered future fame for the young vocalist. She chose Chicago for her more advanced studies, and became the pupil of Mrs. Sara Hershey-Eddy.

== Career ==
She accompanied Mr. and Mrs. Eddy to Europe in 1889, and after singing with great success in London, Paris, and Copenhagen, Dreier spent a year or more in London as a pupil of George Henschel. Dreier sang at the Trocadero at the Exposition Universelle (Paris, 1889). Later, she sang at the dedication of the pipe organ in the Auditorium. During the World's Columbian Exposition (Chicago, 1893), she sang in oratorios, notably Mendelssohn's Elijah, with Lillian Nordica. The comments of U.S. and foreign press were highly complimentary.

She was soloist in Chicago's First Presbyterian Church for 18 years. In later life, she sang for a time in the Evanston First Presbyterian church and in the New England church.

Dreier served as president of the Lake View Musical Society, Chicago.

== Appearances ==
Dreier is mentioned by the name Christine Nilsson in the opening line of Edith Wharton’s acclaimed novel The Age of Innocence. It reads, “On a January evening of the early seventies, Christine Nilsson was singing in Faust at the Academy of Music in New York.” A few pages later mention is made of “Faust-Capoul,” a reference to Victor Capoul.

== Personal life ==
Dreier retained her maiden name on the stage, although on June 4, 1891, she married Otto Albert Dreier (b. 1865). Since 1886, he served as the Danish Vice-Consul in Chicago, where they made their home.

Christine Nielson Dreier died at Augustana Hospital, Chicago, Illinois, May 15, 1926, after undergoing an operation a few days earlier.
