= John Tuschen =

Poet (b. 1949, d. 2005)

John Tuschen (17 September 1949 - August 5, 2005) was an American poet.

== Career ==
Tuschen published four books of poetry during his lifetime; Junk Mail (Broom Street Press), Thighs, Sighs, and Other Things (Quest Publishing), The Percodan Papers (Quest Publishing), and Tuschenetrics (Quest Publishing), which was published in 1974. State Street Poetry Sheets was published posthumously.

A video version of his poem "Uncle Harry's Tombstone" created by Tuschen's son Jordan Caylor became the official selection at "Zebra 6 Video Poetry Film Festival", Berlin, Germany, in 2012; an audio version of the poem along with other works was aired on Madison, WI radio station WORT FM.

Tuschen's work was featured in a segment of Chicago's Sounds From Chicago series of "Experimental Sound Studio" in 1991.

Some of his works have been engraved, along with works of other local poets, into sidewalks in Madison, to serve as a permanent memorial.

A new volume of his work was published with a grant from the Madison Arts Commission in 2016.

== Recognition ==
Tuschen was named the first Poet Laureate of Madison, Wisconsin and given the key to the city by mayor Paul Soglin in 1977, and served in that role for over 20 years.
