= Simon Sparrow =

American painter

- Born: October 16, 1914
- Died: September 26, 2000 (aged 85); Madison, Wisconsin, US
- Education: self-taught
- Known for: Painting and mixed media
- Awards: Wisconsin Visual Arts Lifetime Achievement Award

Simon Sparrow (October 16, 1914 – September 26, 2000) was an American folk artist, a painter and mixed media artist. He was born in Pennsylvania or West Africa, and grew up in North Carolina on a Cherokee Reservation. He was a self-taught artist and received a Wisconsin Visual Art Lifetime Achievement Award (WVALAA) in 2012. Sparrow's work is considered folk art and his piece Assemblage with Found Objects is held by the Smithsonian American Art Museum on the 3rd Floor, Luce Foundation Center.

Simon Sparrow began creating art at age seven and also began his practice of informal and street preaching in his youth. He moved to Philadelphia and enlisted in the army in 1942. He later moved to New York before settling in Madison, Wisconsin. He died in a Madison nursing home in 2000.

Sparrow is best known for his mixed media constructions and paintings, which he began creating once he moved to Madison, Wisconsin in the 1970s. One of his pieces, "Simon Sparrow Outsider Art Picture, ca. 1980" was appraised on Antiques Roadshow in July 2009 for $6,000-8,000. On 20 May 2012, Sparrow was posthumously awarded a WVALAA along with 13 other honorees.

== Exhibitions ==
Some exhibitions of note for Sparrow's work include:

- "Great and Mighty Things" - Philadelphia Museum of Art (2013)

Sponsored by Comcast Corporation and Duane Morris, this exhibition was organized around self-taught artists that worked in "remote or rural places with unconventional methods and with materials such as reclaimed wood, sheet metal, house paint, and stove soot."

- "Off Center: Outsider Art in the Midwest" - Minnesota Museum of American Art (1996)
- "Visionaries, Outsiders and Spiritualists: American Self-Taught Artists" (1994)

Organized by Entourage: Exhibitions of Horsham, PA. this exhibit of 16 self-taught artists included some of Sparrow's "masklike heads (that) appear to radiate auras of energy, as if embodying a spiritual force."

- "Structure and Surface: Beads in Contemporary American Art" - Renwick Gallery (1990)

Featuring some of Sparrow's "untitled collages (that) combine commercial beads, stick figures and found objects such as rocks, metallic chains, glitter and tinsel to portray religious imagery."

- "37 Visionary Works of Outsider Art" - Princeton, Carnegie Center for Art & History (1987)
