= Albert Taubert =

Albert Adolph Taubert
- Born: June 15, 1900; Madison, Wisconsin
- Died: June 13, 1964 (aged 63); Madison, Wisconsin
- Allegiance: United States of America
- Service / branch: United States Marine Corps
- Rank: Major
- Battles / wars: World War I • Battle of Soissons; Banana Wars • Occupation of Haiti; World War II
- Awards: Navy Cross (2); Distinguished Service Cross

Albert Adolph Taubert (June 15, 1900 – June 13, 1964) was a member of the United States Marine Corps who received the Navy Cross and Distinguished Service Cross for his actions during the Battle of Soissons in World War I. He was also awarded the French Military Medal for participation in the Meuse-Argonne Offensive, as well as the Italian War Merit Cross. Later, he received a second Navy Cross during the United States occupation of Haiti, during which he participated in killing the Caco leader Benoît Batraville.

Taubert was born in Madison, Wisconsin. After serving in the Marines as an enlisted man during the First World War, he served at a Marine Corps engineer training center during the Second World War.

== Citations ==
His Distinguished Service Cross citation reads:

The President of the United States of America, authorized by Act of Congress, July 9, 1918, takes pleasure in presenting the Distinguished Service Cross to Private Albert Adolph Taubert (MCSN: 78838), United States Marine Corps, for extraordinary heroism while serving with the Sixty-Sixth Company, Fifth Regiment (Marines), 2d Division, A.E.F., in action in the Villers Cotterets Forest, south of Soissons, France, 18 July 1918. Private Taubert went out in advance of the line of his company into the fire of a machine gun that was shooting at him and captured the gun and its crew.

His first Navy Cross citation reads:

The President of the United States of America takes pleasure in presenting the Navy Cross to Private Albert Adolph Taubert (MCSN: 78838), United States Marine Corps, for extraordinary heroism while serving with the 66th Company, 5th Regiment (Marines), 2d Division, A.E.F. in action in the Villers Cotterets Forest, south of Soissons, France, 18 July 1918. Private Taubert went out in advance of the line of his company into the fire of a machine gun that was shooting at him and captured the gun and its crew.

His second Navy Cross citation reads:

The President of the United States of America takes pleasure in presenting a Gold Star in lieu of a Second Award of the Navy Cross to Sergeant Albert Adolph Taubert (MCSN: 78838), United States Marine Corps, for extraordinary heroism in the line of his profession while serving with the First Provisional Brigade of Marines (Gendarmerie d'Haiti), 19 May 1920. With total disregard of personal danger he attacked, with Captain Jesse L. Perkins and two other enlisted men, a band of about seventy-five armed bandits of the Mirebalais District, resulting in the death of the greatest bandit leader, Benoit Batraville, and the practical suppression of banditry throughout the District.
