= Governor's Guards (Florida) =

Troop C, 1-153rd Cavalry
- Active: 1857–1865, 1877–1891, 1897–present
- Country: United States
- Allegiance: United States
- Branch: Florida Army National Guard
- Type: Infantry/Cavalry (RSTA)
- Role: Reconnaissance, surveillance, and target acquisition
- Size: Troop
- Garrison/HQ: Tallahassee, Florida
- Nicknames: "Governor's Guards"; Call Sign: "Regulators" (formerly: "Raptor")
- Engagements: Third Seminole War; American Civil War; World War I World War II; Operation Iraqi Freedom; Operation New Dawn
- Decorations: Presidential Unit Citation (US) Philippine Presidential Unit Citation

The Governor's Guards is a historic unit of the Florida Army National Guard, stationed in Tallahassee, Florida. Its current designation is Troop C, 1st Squadron, 153rd Cavalry. The unit has one of the oldest continuous lineages in the Florida National Guard. In 1857, Captain John Parkhill, his brother Samuel M. Parkhill, and Theordore Brevard, Jr. formed a mounted company of "Leon Volunteers" to fight in the Third Seminole War, where John Parkhill was killed in action. John Parkhill's cousin, Captain George W. Parkhill and his brother, Richard C. Parkhill formed a new company called the "Governor's Guards" circa 1859-1860 which later changed its name to "Howell Guards" and fought with the 2nd Florida Infantry during the Civil War. After the war, the company reorganized as "Governor's Guards", a local militia company, under the command of Captain Alexander Moseley and have had a near-continuous lineage henceforth. The Governor's Guards served as an infantry unit for most of its existence, including in the Civil War, World War I, World War II, the Iraq War and the Global War on Terrorism. The unit consolidated with the Franklin Guards, a detachment in Apalachicola and since 2007 has been Charlie Troop, a dismounted infantry reconnaissance troop.

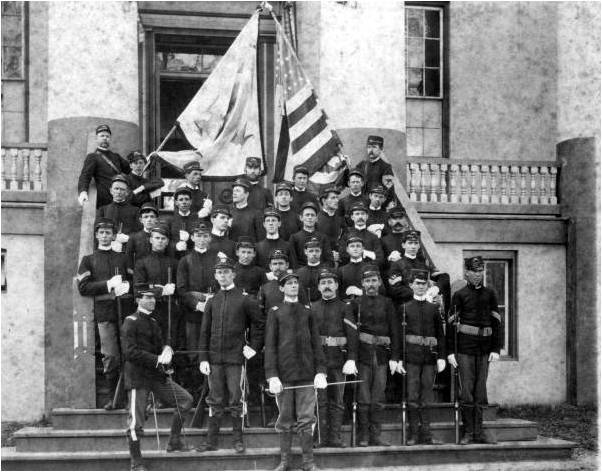
The Governor's Guards on the Capitol steps in 1899.

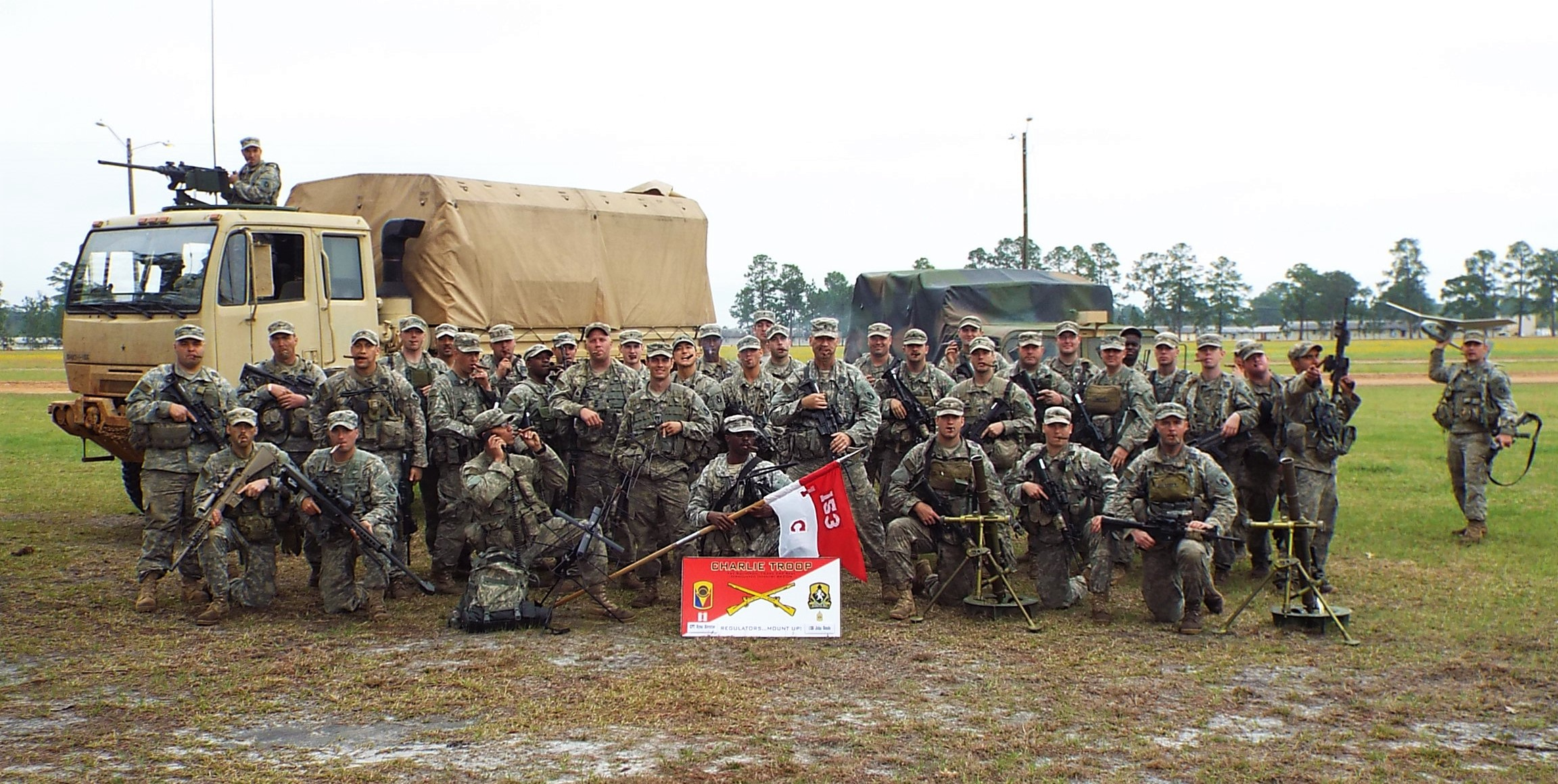
C Troop at the end of Annual Training, March 2015 Fort Stewart

== Tallahassee Militia in the Third Seminole Wars (1857-1858) ==
With a renewal of pursuit against the Seminole Indians in South Florida, Captain John Parkhill, a 34 year old prominent citizen of Tallahassee, raised a company of Florida Mounted Volunteers, called the "Leon Volunteers" in July, 1857. The vast majority of his militia were farmers from the local area with a couple of "labourers", and four privates listed in the muster rolls as a saddler, printer, carpenter and mechanic. Most were born in Florida and Georgia, although at least three of his soldiers were born in Germany, and one was from France. Each volunteer provided his own horse. They were called into federal service by the President on July 29 for a term of six months. Captain Parkhill's company of three officers and 76 soldiers moved to Fort Myers where they searched for Seminoles hiding in the Everglades. On November 26 Captain Parkhill led a force to burn Seminole crops near Royal Palm Hammock. The next day he led a six-man patrol searching for Indian trails. His patrol was ambushed and he and five soldiers were killed. After his death his First Lieutenant, Theodore W. Brevard, Jr. took command and was promoted to Captain. Captain Parkhill was the most notable fatality among the Florida militia and a monument was erected in front of the Florida capitol by Leon County citizens "as a testimonial of their high esteem for his character and public services". Including Captain Parkhill, 11 soldiers were killed or died while in service, three were discharged with a disability, and one private deserted.

== Civil War (1861-1865) ==
The Governor's Guards were organized in 1859/1860, an independent Cavalry Company, under command of John Parkhill's (former commander of Leon Volunteers) cousin, Captain George Washington Parkhill. After Florida seceded from the Union, the company reorganized as an independent Infantry Company in July 1861 by Captain George Washington Parkhill and renamed themselves Howell Guards in honor of Confederate President Jefferson Davis' wife, the former Miss Howell. The Governor's Guards drilled daily in Tallahassee until their departure by train on August 12, 1861. They arrived in Richmond and were mustered into Confederate service on 20 August 1861 as an independent company, trained on artillery and sent to Evansport, Virginia on 27 September 1861 where they manned a battery of guns overlooking the Potomac River.

In March, 1862 the Governor's Guards were ordered to abandon the fort and march toward Fredericksburg, Virginia. They were then sent to defend Richmond and were temporarily attached to the Fifth Alabama Battalion and then attached on 10 June 1862 to Fifty-Fifth Virginia Volunteers.

On June 20, 1862 Howell Guards joined Second Florida near Richmond as "Company M". Howell Guards fought in every battle with the Army of Northern Virginia from the Peninsula campaign to the surrender at Appomattox Courthouse where the company had only 16 soldiers left to muster out on April 9, 1865.

== Post Civil War and Spanish–American War (1877-1916) ==
The first known post-Civil War unit in Tallahassee was organized as the "Governor's Guards" in 1877 under the command of Captain Ed Lewis with First Lieutenant Franklin Pierce Damon, Second Lieutenant William Andrew Rawls, 5 sergeants, 4 corporals, 2 musicians, and 60 privates. Ed Lewis was issued infantry equipment of 40 Springfield breach loading rifles, caliber 50, 40 steel bayonets with leather scabbard, cartridge boxes with plates and belts. Captain Alexander Moseley took command of the Governor's Guards between 1879 and 1880.

Armory on Monroe Street across from Capitol. Turn of the 19th Century.

Captain Moseley was the son of Florida's first state governor, William Dunn Moseley. Captain Moseley was a 2nd Florida Infantry veteran, having been appointed 2nd Lieutenant in the Saint Augustine Rifles (Co H) at the formation of the regiment on July 13, 1861. He was later elected Captain and commander of the same company on May 11, 1862 and promoted to the 2nd Florida Regiment's Major after Major George W. Call was killed at the Battle of Seven Pines on May 31, 1864. Captain Moseley surrendered with the 2nd Florida at Appomattox on April 9, 1865.

Both Ed. Lewis and Alex Moseley received 750 and 1,000 metallic cartridges for their company's rifles. Captain Moseley additionally received one 12-pound howitzer with carriage and limber, and other artillery ordnance for the Governor's Guards.

Captain Moseley and the Governor's Guards were ordered on February 8, 1881, along with the Jefferson Rifles and Madison Guards to report to the sheriff in Madison to "assist in preserving the peace". The full companies were on duty for four days when they were relieved by the Jacksonville Light Infantry and the Columbia Light Infantry. In the Adjutant General Report of 1881–1882, it stated that "too much cannot be said in praise of the very competent and faithful discharge of duty, both of officers and men, on this occasion" and that "all serious disturbance was averted, and peace and quiet soon restored." The Governor's Guards' pay roll amounted to $99.84. By 1882, W. A. Rawls was promoted to First Lieutenant, replacing F. P. Damon, and Second Lieutenant William Cheever Lewis joined the company. In 1882, First Lieutenant W. C. Lewis was issued 50 bayonet scabbards, 50 gun slings, 50 cartridge boxes, waist belts and plates. The Governor's Guards "voluntarily disbanded without orders from headquarters" as stated in the Adjutant General's Report of 1885 to 1886, and had not yet surrendered their arms of fifty caliber 50 rifles and accoutrements.

The Governor's Guards reformed under command of William C. Lewis, former First Lieutenant on March 4, 1897. Officially they were Company C, 4th Battalion, Florida State Troops; one company among 20 throughout the State Troops. Company C conducted their first "annual camp of instruction" at Camp Henderson on Leon Heights near Tallahassee with all of the Florida State Troops during May 18 – 25, 1897. During this encampment two U.S. Army officers, Captain Thomas M. Woodruff and Hunter Liggett of the 5th U. S. Infantry, acted as instructor and inspector. "All of the companies have obtained a considerable degree of excellence, but Company C, Fourth Battalion, organized in Tallahassee only in February, was deserving of the greatest praise in proficiency and progress," Major General Patrick Houstoun, Adjutant General. Captain Liggett rated the whole Florida State Troops, "Proficiency in battalion drill, fair in close order; fair in extended order; in ceremonies, excellent. Guard mounting very well done." During this period, units had one drill per week, usually practicing the manual of arms and simpler company movements.

In 1898, Florida was asked by the U.S. government to provide one regiment of 12 companies for service in the Spanish–American War. Company C was disbanded on May 23, 1898 along with other units to meet this requirement. While many from Tallahassee volunteered and served, they did not serve as a company from Tallahassee. In fact, the 20 companies from around the state were consolidated, reorganized, and mustered into federal service 20–25 May 1898 at Tampa as the 1st Florida Volunteer Infantry. The Florida regiment did not deploy overseas and eight of the companies were mustered out 3 December 1898 at Tampa and four companies mustered out 27 January 1899 at Huntsville, Alabama. The Florida units were reorganized 17–18 August 1899 in the Florida State Troops as the 1st and 2nd Regiments of Infantry.

The infantrymen from Tallahassee were reorganized as Company G, 1st Regiment in 1899 under command of Captain Lewis M. Liveley. A. C. Spiller took command sometime between January and May 1900. The Florida regiments were reorganized and Governor's Guards became Company D, 1st Florida Infantry circa December 18, 1900, with Captain E. A. Dickey, First Lieutenant W. H. Markham, and Second Lieutenant Theodore Gibbs. Governor's Guards were activated for state service May 3–22, 1901 to aid in relief during the Jacksonville Great Fire of 1901. Company D disbanded July 15, 1904.

The unit was reorganized as Company C, 1st Infantry on June 7, 1907 and conducted a joint coast defense exercise in Pensacola in the same year. Company C was activated for state duty from October 30 to November 15, 1912 to help restore order during the violent Railway Strike in Jacksonville. The unit was redesignated Company I, 1st Florida Infantry on March 19, 1915. It was disbanded June 14, 1916, for falling below a Federal inspection standard.

== Mexican Border, Great War, and buildup (1916-39) ==
The Tallahassee infantrymen, as part of the 2nd Florida Infantry Regiment, mustered into federal service in June 1916 at Camp Foster, Florida and then deployed to the Texas-Mexico border in support of the Punitive Expedition against Pancho Villa. During their border service they used the time to drill and get ready for the Great War. Second Florida mustered out of federal service in March 1917.

The Tallahassee unit was reorganized as Company B, 1st Florida Infantry on May 29, 1917 under command of Captain Sydney J. Catts, and drafted into federal service 5 August 1917, and sent to Camp Wheeler, GA. Florida's 1st and 2nd Regiments were consolidated, reorganized, and redesignated 1 October 1917 as the 124th Infantry and assigned to the 31st Division, as part of the mobilization for World War I. After the regiment arrived in France, the Division and subordinate units were split up into small groups and sent as replacements where needed. Since Florida Guardsmen did not fight under the designation of their regiment, campaign streamers and honors could not be given to the regiment. However, the regiment did receive the WWI streamer without inscription. Many Guardsmen volunteered to serve in the 1st, 2nd, 27th, 30th, 42nd, and 82nd Divisions in France. The regiment officially demobilized 14 January 1919 at Camp Gordon, Georgia.

The unit was reorganized after World War I as Company M, 124th Infantry on June 26, 1924 under command of Captain Charles N. Hobbs and conducted annual training at Camp Joseph E. Johnston from July 13 to 27 of the same year. Company M had been formed less than a month earlier and actually reported to camp without uniforms or equipment. Company M conducted annual training August 2 to 16, 1925 and July 11 to 25, 1926 at Camp Joseph E. Johnston. At the end of 1929 to 1930, Company M served on state active duty to set up roadblocks and checkpoints to inspect citrus fruit during the Mediterranean Fruit Fly Quarantine. The company again served on state active duty for a jail riot in Tallahassee in 1929. In October 1934 the company aided in ending the Marianna Riots in Marianna. The company also served at a civil trial in Tallahassee in 1937.

== World War II (1939-46) ==
Company M, 124th Infantry, a heavy weapons company, participated in the Louisiana Maneuvers at Camp Beauregard from August 4 through 24, 1940. Shortly after the maneuvers Company M was mobilized, along with the 124th Infantry, for one year of training at Camp Blanding on November 25, 1940 under command of Captain Henry W. McMillan, Jr. Company M had three other officers assigned at their federalization: First Lieutenant Julius C. Newton, Second Lieutenants Jay L. Hall and Herbert C. Kaufman all of Tallahassee.

The 124th Infantry was relieved from assignment to the 31st Division on December 15, 1941 and served as a model training unit for the Infantry School at Fort Benning, Georgia. The unit was then sent to Fort Jackson, South Carolina and inactivated March 2, 1944. By the time of their inactivation at Fort Jackson many of the original soldiers had volunteered or had been reassigned to other units. The inactivation came as a shock to many in Florida and Governor Spessard Holland appealed to the Secretary of War that the 124th Infantry be kept in service, "Its inactivation would be a severe blow to morale both in and outside the service and arouse bitterness in the hearts of many of our citizens who have served in it in the past".

The 124th Infantry was reactivated in Australia on April 5 with personnel from the 154th Infantry and reassigned to the 31st Infantry Division. The 124th Infantry experienced intense combat in New Guinea, Morotai, and Mindanao in the Southern Philippines. After the war the unit was deactivated at Camp Stoneman, California on December 16, 1945.

== Rebirth and Cold War (1946-2001) ==
=== Company A, 124th Infantry ===
L to R: Maj. General Maxwell C. Snyder (of Jacksonville), Commanding General 48th Armored Division; Col. Louie C. Wadsworth (of Live Oak), Commander Combat Command A; Lt. Col. Ralph C. Davis (of Tallahassee) Commander 1st Armored Rifle Battalion; Capt. Charles G. Mohr (of Tallahassee) Commander Headquarters Company 1st Armored Rifle Battalion.

Company A, 124th Infantry was reorganized on January 24, 1947 at the armory on Monroe Street, across from Lake Ella with 1LT Ralph C. Davis commanding. The regiment's headquarters was in Jacksonville and they were part of the 48th Infantry Division. Company A performed its first annual field training at Fort Jackson from July 18 to August 1, 1948. Conducted Annual Training July 24 to August 7, 1949 under command of Captain William H. Mapoles (a former sergeant from the 1940 Company M). Conducted Annual Training at Fort Jackson from July 22 to August 6, 1950 under command of Captain Russell W. Buckhalt (another former sergeant from 1940 Company M). Conducted Annual Training July 8 to 22, 1951 at Fort McClellan, Alabama and was awarded the Captain C. J. Hackney Award for close order drill. Conducted Annual Training July 22 to August 10 under command of Lieutenant E. Z. Nicholson and awarded the Hackney Award a second year in a row. Conducted Annual Training July 5 to 19, 1953 under command of Captain Russell W. Buckhalt at Fort McClellan and awarded the Army National Guard Award for "Efficiency in Training". Conducted Annual Training June 13 to 27, 1954 at Fort McClellan and again awarded the "Efficiency in Training" award.

In 1955, Company A, 124 Infantry reorganized into Headquarters, Headquarters and Service Company, 124th Armored Rifle Battalion (A.R.B.) with Captain Buckhalt still in command. The 124th A.R.B. received M41 Walker Bulldog tanks and Armored Personnel Carriers; these tanks were pooled next to the armory on Monroe St. The unit conducted Annual Training from July 1 to 15, 1956 at Fort Stewart, Georgia. Conducted Annual Training June 30 to July 14, 1957 at Fort Stewart under command of Lieutenant William B. Langley and was awarded Small Bore Rifle Matches Trophy '56-'57. Conducted Annual Training June 8 to 22, 1958 at Fort Stewart. The unit was redesignated Headquarters and Headquarters Company (HHC), 1st Armored Rifle Battalion, 124th Infantry on April 15, 1959 under command of Captain William B. Langley. Lieutenant Charles G. Mohr took command on November 1, 1959.

On February 15, 1963 the unit was expanded and reorganized into two different units: HHC, 260th Engineer Group (Combat) and Company C, 261st Engineer Battalion (Combat). Captain Charles G. Mohr, the commander of HHC, 1st ARB, 124th Infantry, took command of Company C, 261st Engineers. The Engineer company only lasted one year in Tallahassee before another reorganization which transferred Company C, 261st Engineers to Bonifay and stood up Troop E, 153rd Cavalry in its place. Captain Harry J. Raymond, formerly an infantry lieutenant in HHC, 1st ARB, 124th Infantry was the first commander of Troop E.

=== Troop E, 153rd Cavalry ===
Troop E, 153rd Cavalry was first organized 1 March 1964 as the mounted reconnaissance element of the 53rd Armored Brigade under command of Captain Harry J. Raymond. The troop had tanks and armored personnel carriers (APCs). Troops served on state active duty on March 27, 1964 for Operation Good Friday. Troop conducted its first Annual Training from August 9 to 23, 1964 at Fort Stewart under command of Captain William B. Nunn. Unit aided in search for a missing man in the Attapulgus Creek Swamp from August 24 to 25, 1964. Conducted Annual Training June 27 to July 11, 1965, and June 5 to 19, 1966 at Fort Stewart.

=== Company A, 3rd Battalion, 124th Infantry ===
Effective January 20, 1968 a 3rd infantry battalion was constituted and Troop E was disbanded. The Tallahassee company became Alpha Company, 3rd Battalion, 124th Infantry, 53rd Infantry Brigade and remained as such until 2006–07. Company A was a light infantry company. They specialized in jungle fighting and made many rotations to Fort Sherman, Panama to conduct annual training. In 1992, Alpha Company, under the command of Captain Mike Canzoneri, deployed to Miami to assist victims of Hurricane Andrew. In 1998, the Company reorganized as Company A (minus Det 1) and a separate unit, Detachment 1, Company C, 3-124 Infantry in Apalachicola, reflagged as Detachment 1 under Company A of Tallahassee.

== Post 9/11 (2001-present) ==
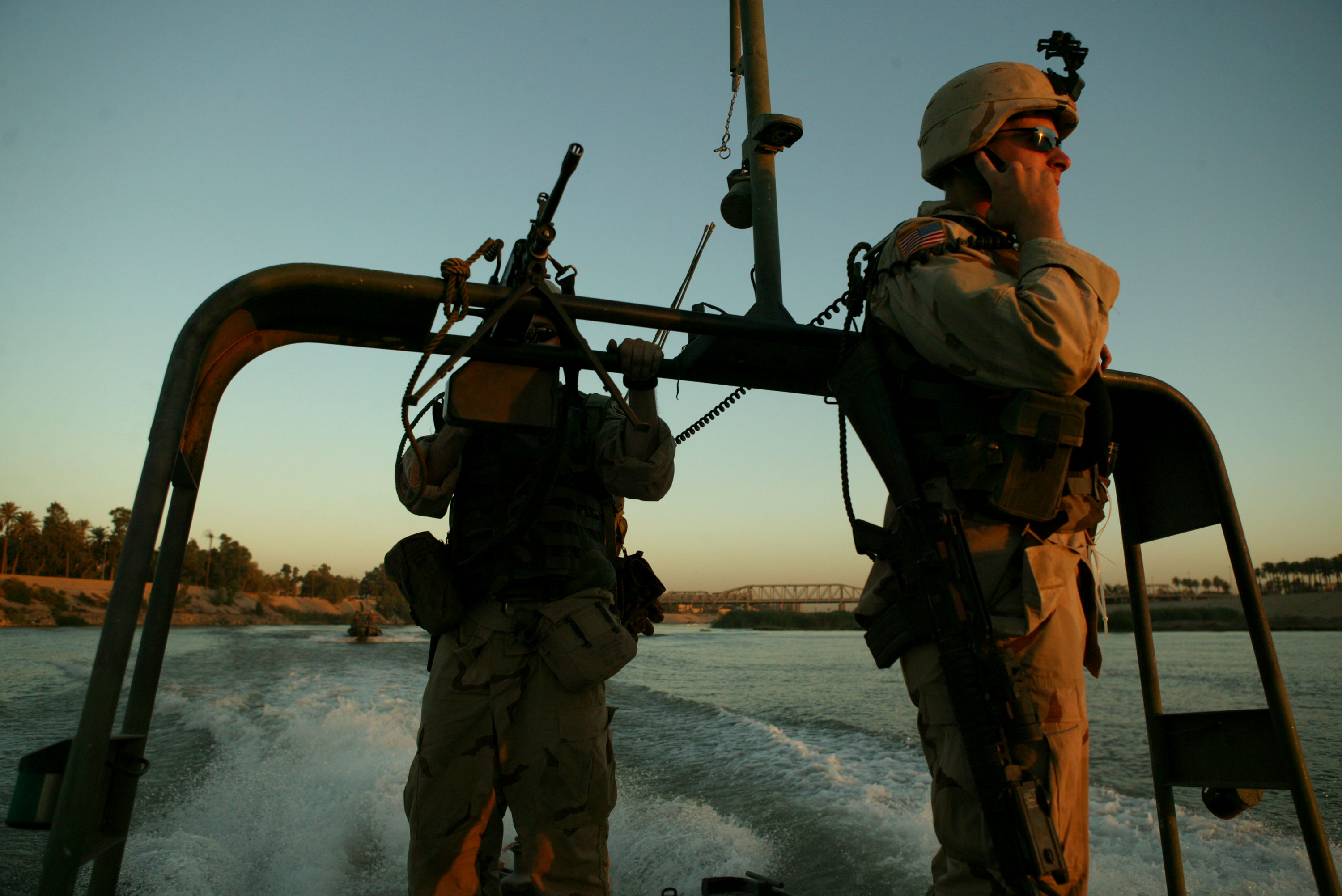
Infantrymen on a river patrol in Baghdad.

After the attacks of September 11, 2001, the National Guard transformed from a strategic reserve to a fully operational force. Company A responded immediately after that 9/11 attacks and set up security at the armory and Tallahassee airport.

=== Iraq, 2003-04 ===
Company A was mobilized just prior to Christmas 2002 and moved up to Fort Stewart, GA for training. The battalion deployed to Kuwait in January and were part of the initial invasion of Iraq. They were attached to 108th Air Defense Artillery Brigade, 3rd Infantry Division, and 1st Marine Division during the invasion. When 3rd ID left, 3-124 Infantry was attached to 1st Armored Division. The battalion was assigned to downtown Baghdad and redeployed in 2004.

=== "Charlie Troop", 1st Squadron, 153rd Cavalry ===
In 2006-07 the Army made its reorganizations among brigades to transform them into brigade combat teams (BCT), the brigade reconnaissance unit was only a single troop; in the 53rd Infantry Brigade it was E Troop, 153rd Cavalry in Ocala. The 2006-07 BCT reorganization disbanded E Troop altogether and converted the 3rd Battalion "Warrior", 124th Infantry into what is the 1st Squadron, 153rd Cavalry. Though E Troop and 1st Squadron share the same coat of arms, 1-153 Cavalry was constituted entirely from the infantrymen of 3-124 Infantry and so continue the 3rd Battalion's lineage.

=== Kuwait, 2010 ===
Troop C deployed with its parent unit, the 1-153 Cavalry, part of the 53rd Infantry Brigade Combat Team in support of Operations Iraqi Freedom and New Dawn. In preparation for their 2010 deployment as a Security Force (SECFOR) company, the unit was filled with cross-leveled soldiers from other Florida units over the course of 2009. This had to be done in order to increase the scout troop from 80 to 130 soldiers. The infantry officers and sergeants formed a cadre that organized and trained the new soldiers to perform security missions; nearly all leadership positions continued to be held only be the infantrymen of C Troop. The squadron underwent intense pre-mobilization training at Camp Blanding, FL for the entire month of October 2009 where the dismounted scout troop practiced mobility operations with HMMWVs.

They mobilized under Title 10 orders on 2 January 2010. The soldiers boarded buses that drove them from the Tallahassee armory to Panama City, Florida where they flew to Fort Hood, Texas for two months of mobilization training.

In the first week of March the troop arrived at Camp Buehring, Kuwait. C Troop was responsible for quick reaction force (QRF) missions around Camps Buehring and Virginia and an area reaction force mission (ARF) for northern Kuwait. The troop redeployed and demobilized at Fort Stewart, GA in December, 2010.

== Unit designations ==
- Captain J. Parkhill's "Leon Volunteers" of the 2nd Regiment of Florida Mounted Volunteers (July 29, 1857 - January 28, 1858)
- Governor's Guards, an independent cavalry company (circa 1859/1860 - July, 1861)
- Howell Guards, an independent company (July, 1861 - June 20, 1862)
- Company M "Howell Guards", 2nd Florida (June 20, 1862 - April 9, 1865)
- Governors Guards, Volunteer Militia (1877 - circa 1885)
- Company C "Governor's Guards", 4th Battalion, Florida State Troops (March 4, 1897 – 1898)
- Company G "Governor's Guards", 2nd Battalion, 1st Regiment, Florida State Troops (April 16, 1900 - )
- Company D, 1st Infantry ( -July 15, 1904)
- Company C, 1st Infantry (June 7, 1907 – March 19, 1915)
- Company I, 1st Florida Infantry (March 19, 1915 – June 14, 1916)
- Company B, 1st Florida Regiment of Infantry (May 29, 1917 – August 5, 1917)
- Company M, 124th Infantry, 31st Infantry Division (June 26, 1924 – November 25, 1940)
- Company A, 124th Infantry, 48th Infantry Division (January 24, 1946 – 1955)
- Headquarters, Headquarters and Service Company, 124 Armored Infantry Battalion, 48th Armored Division (1955–April 15, 1959)
- Headquarters and Headquarters Company (HHC), 1st Armored Rifle Battalion, 124th Infantry, 48th Armored Division (April 15, 1959 – February 1, 1963)
- Company C, 261st Engineer Battalion (Combat) (February 15, 1963 - March 1, 1964)
- Troop E, 153rd Cavalry, 53rd Armored Brigade (March 1, 1964 – January 20, 1968)
- Company A, 3rd Battalion, 124th Infantry, 53rd Infantry Brigade (January 20, 1968- )
- Troop C, 1st Squadron, 153rd Cavalry, 53rd Infantry Brigade Combat Team (September 1, 2007–present)

== Decorations ==
Ribbon	Award	Streamer embroidered	Order No.
Dark blue ribbon with a gold border	Presidential Unit Citation (Army)	NEW GUINEA 12 July - 1 August 1944	War Department General Order 122-46
Dark blue ribbon with a gold border	Presidential Unit Citation (Army)	IRAQ 2003	Permanent Orders 110-15, 20 April 2009
blue, yellow, and red horizontal stripes	Presidential Unit Citation (Navy)	IRAQ 2003	Permanent Orders 100-25, 9 April 2008
	Philippine Presidential Unit Citation	17 OCTOBER 1944 TO 4 JULY 1945	Department of the Army General Order 47-50
	Florida Governor's Meritorious Unit Citation	2003	
	Florida Governor's Meritorious Unit Citation	2010	State of Florida Dep't of Military Affairs Permanent Orders 29-9, 5 December 2012

== Commanders ==
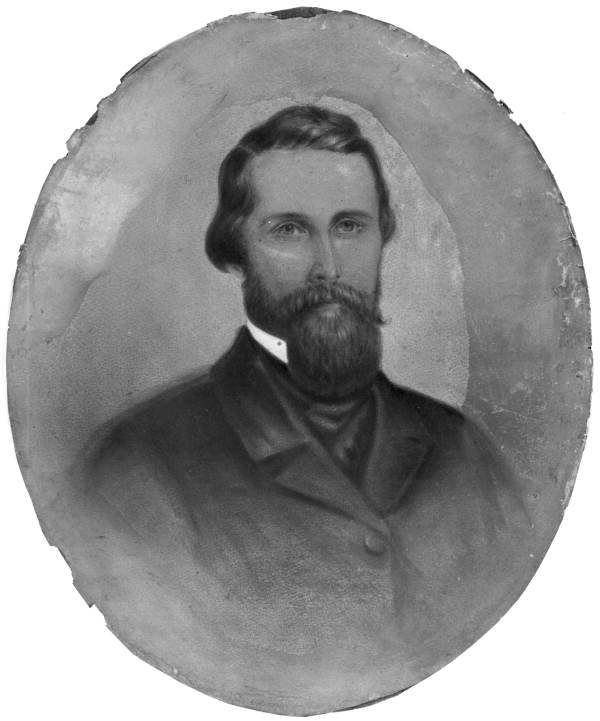
CPT John Parkhill, "Leon Volunteers" of the 2nd Regiment of Florida Mounted Volunteers, 7/29/1857 - killed in action 11/28/1857.

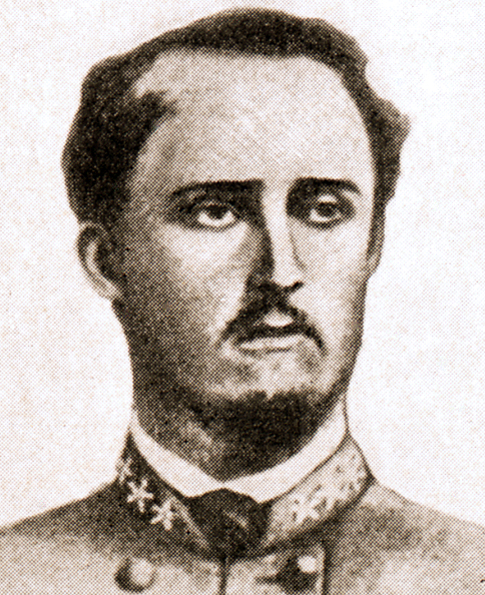
CPT Theodore W. Brevard, Jr., "Leon Volunteers" of the 2nd Regiment of Florida Mounted Volunteers, 11/28/1857 - 1/29/1858.

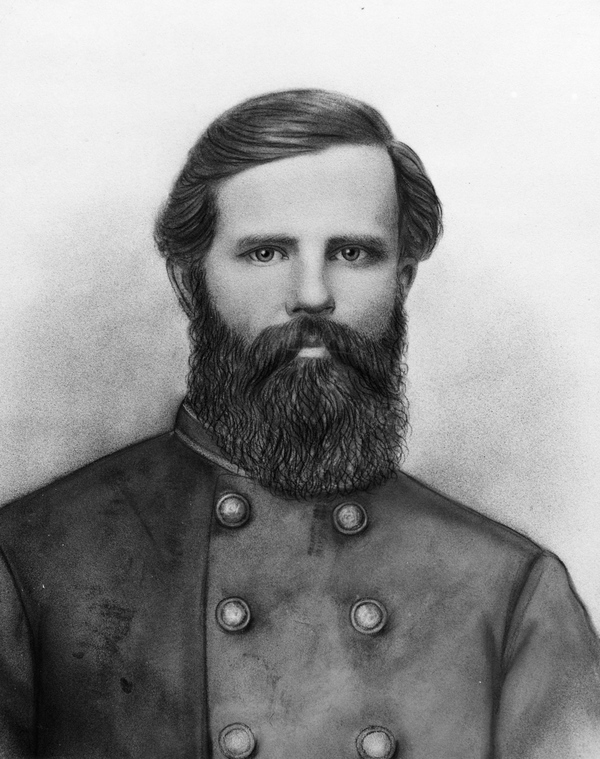
CPT George W. Parkhill, circa 1860, killed at Battle of Gaines's Mill, 5/27/1862

CPT Richard Call Parkhill, 5/1862 - circa 6/30/1862, wounded at Frazier's Farm, later resigned.

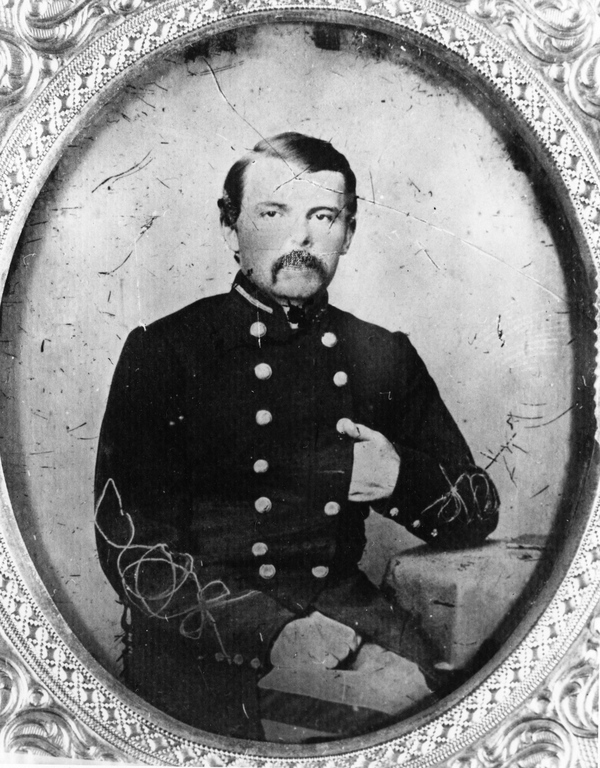
CPT Amos Whitehead, circa 6/30/1862 - circa 9/17/1862, wounded and disabled at Battle of Sharpsburg, resigned.

CPT Elliot Hampton, killed at Battle of Gettysburg, circa 9/17/1862 - 7/1/1863.

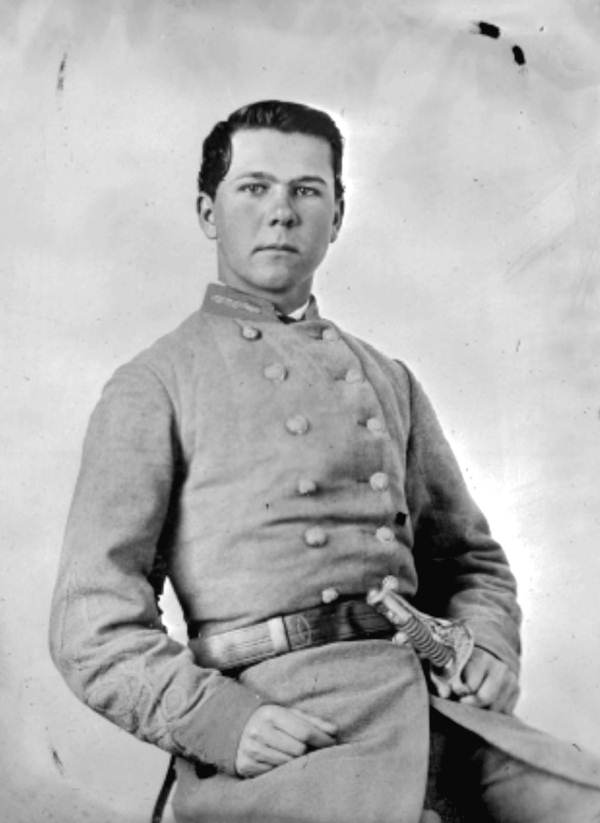
CPT John Day Perkins, 7/2/1863, wounded and captured at Gettysburg, his leg was amputated and he was held prisoner at Cape Henry and then Point Lookout; exchanged and released on March 9, 1864.

CPT Julian Betton, 7/2/1863, wounded at Gettysburg.

CPT William I. Vason, Governor's Guards, 1877.

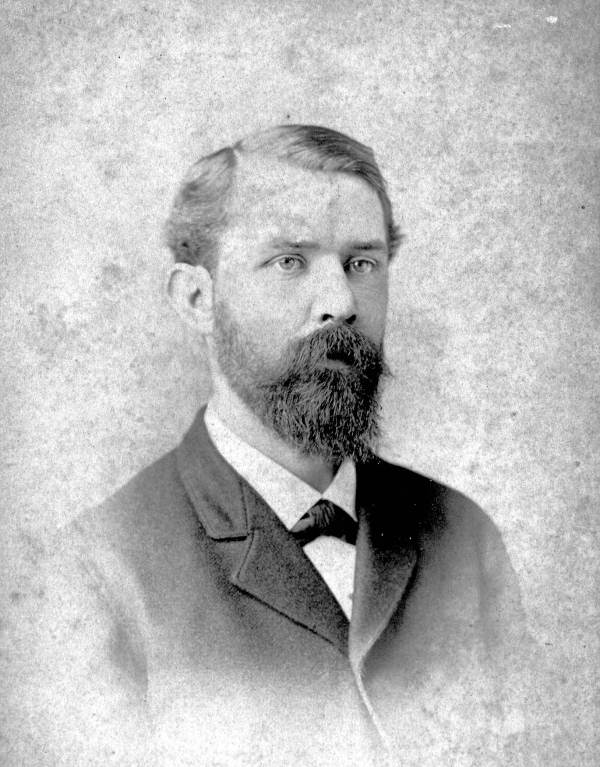
CPT Edward Lewis, Governor's Guards, 1877-circa 1879.

CPT Alexander Moseley, Governor's Guards, circa 1879-circa 1885.

CPT Richard Alexander Shine, Governor's Guards, circa 1887-circa 1889.

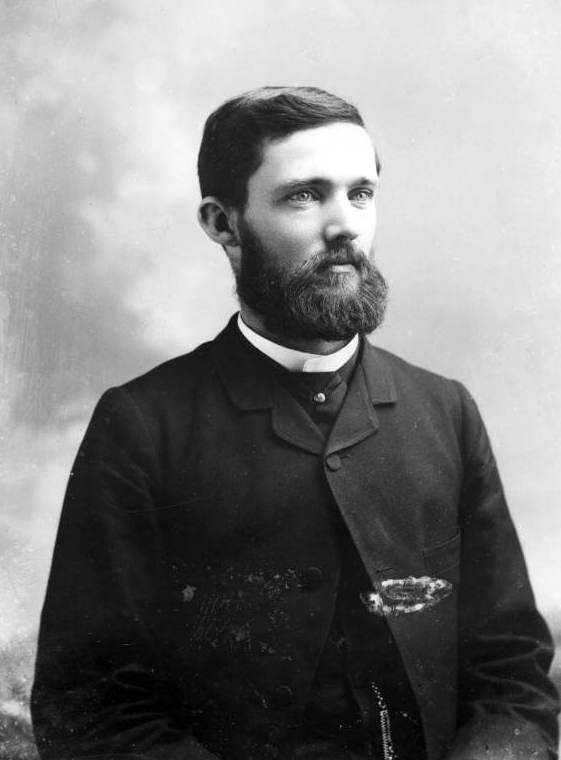
CPT William C. Lewis, Company C, 4th Separate Battalion, 3/4/1897 - 5/23/1898.

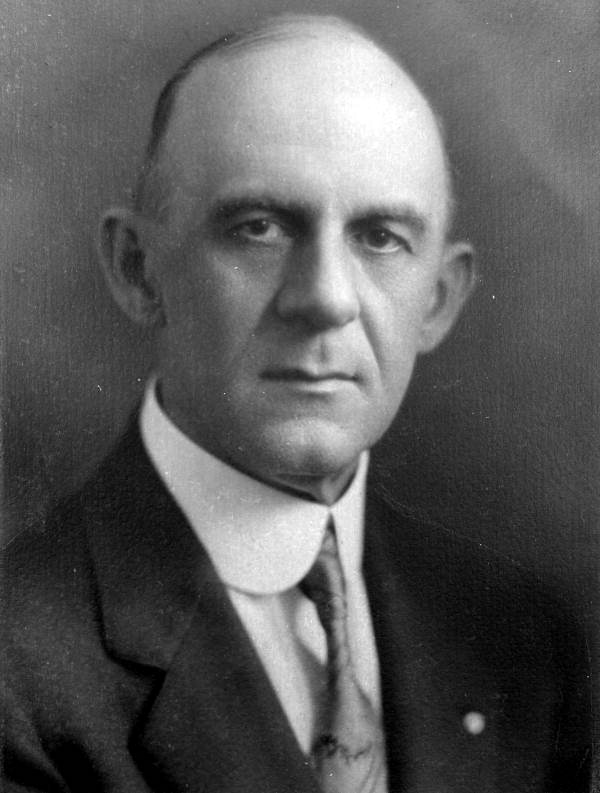
CPT Lewis M. Lively, Company G, 2nd Battalion, 2nd Florida Infantry, 12/25/1898-1900. He later founded the Lively Technical Center.

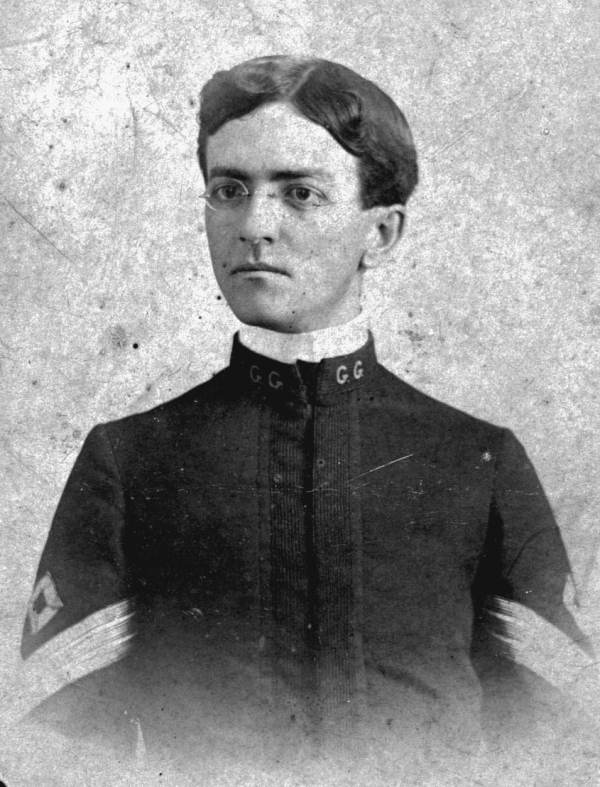
CPT Arthur C. Spiller, Company G, 2nd Battalion, 2nd Florida Infantry, 1900 -.

CPT E. A. Dickey, Company D, 1st Florida Infantry, 12/10/1900 - .

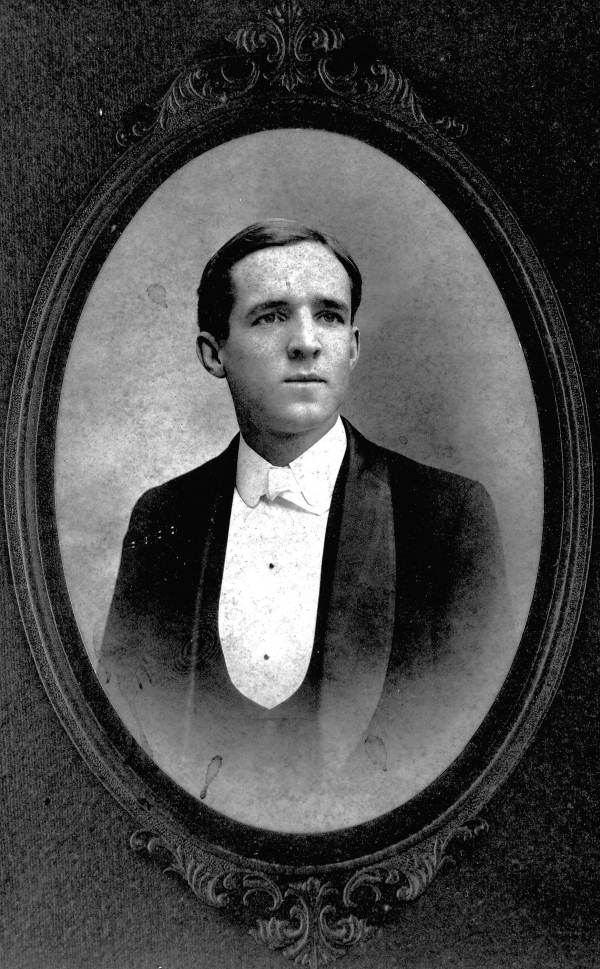
CPT George Edward Lewis, Company D, 1st Florida Infantry, 1901 - 3/22/1902. Commanded Governor's Guards in Jacksonville in support after the Great Fire of 1901; served as Mayor of Tallahassee in 1930.

CPT Adrian D. Williams, Company D, 1st Florida Infantry, 7/30/1902 - 11/8/1902.

1LT William H. Markham, Company D, 1st Florida Infantry, 11/8/1902 - .

CPT Joseph L. Simms, Company D, 1st Florida Infantry, 5/11/1903 - 7/15/1904.

CPT James Stuart Lewis, Company C, 1st Florida Infantry, 1907.

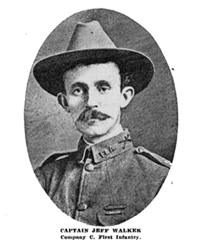
CPT Jeff M. Walker, Company C, 1st Florida Infantry, 3/1911.

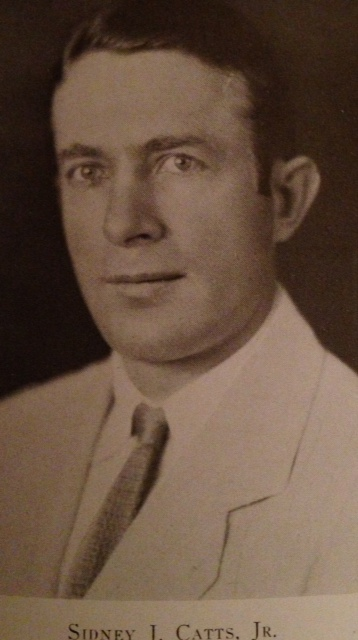
CPT Sydney J. Catts, Jr., Company B, 1st Florida Infantry, 5/29/1917 - 8/5/1917. Transferred on November 11, 1917 to 118th Field Artillery, later served in 28th Infantry in the 8th Infantry Division in France. Later the Adjutant General of Florida from 9/1/1919 to 1/3/1921. Son of the 22nd Governor of Florida, Sidney Johnston Catts.

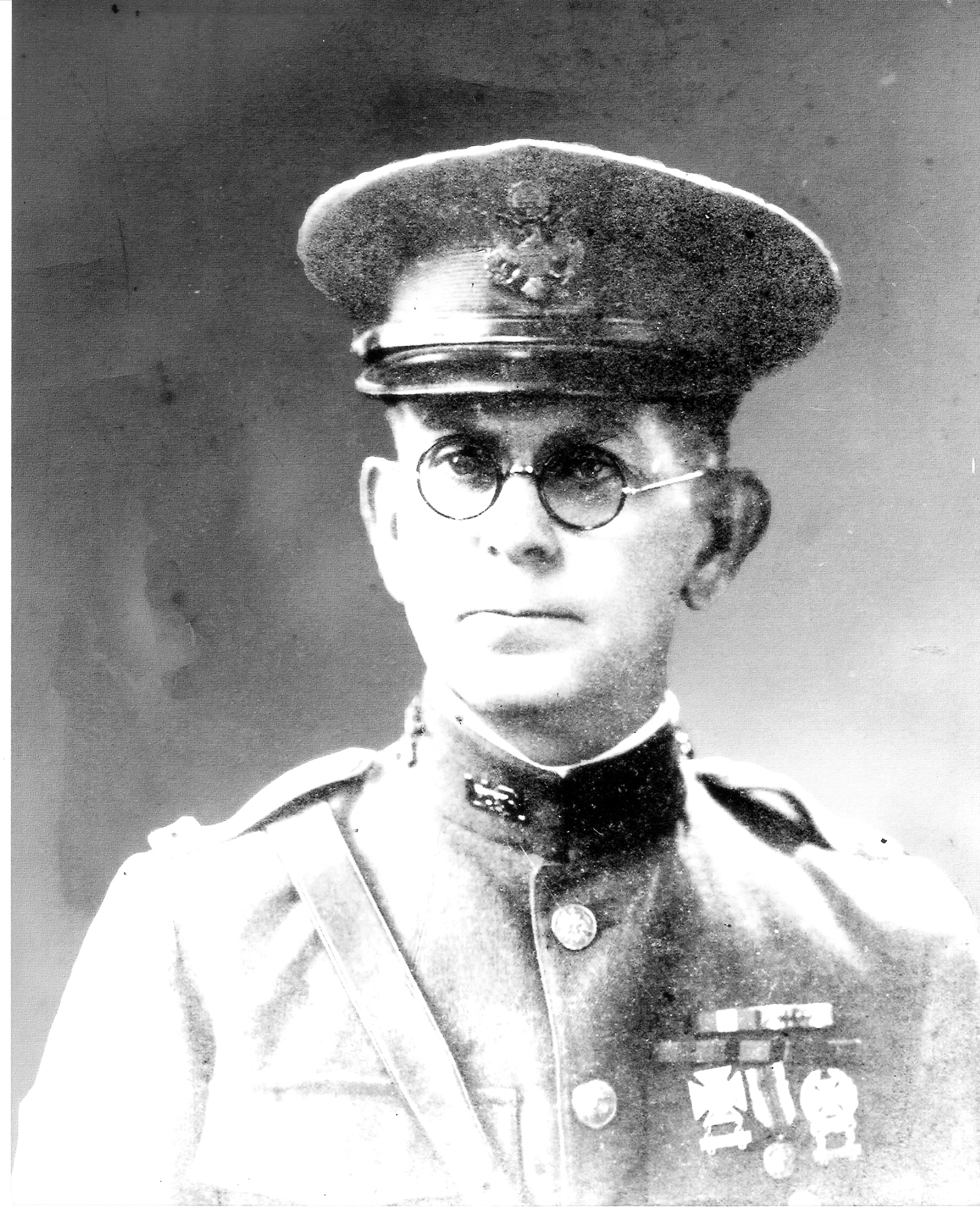
CPT Charles N. Hobbs, Company M, 124th Infantry, 6/16/1924 - 2/1/1927.

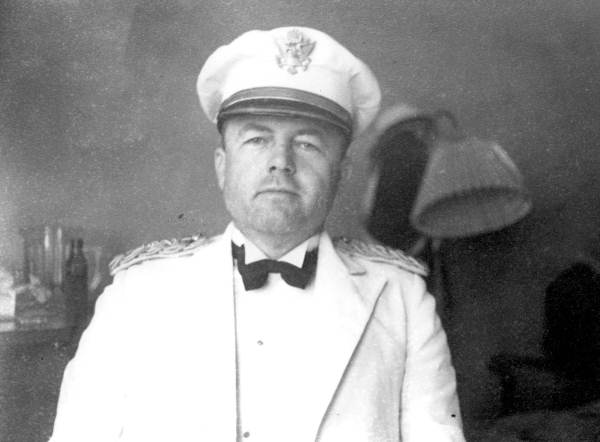
CPT Fred Henry Davis, Company M, 124th Infantry, 2/1/1927 - 1928. Later Speaker of the Florida House, Attorney General of Florida, and Florida Supreme Court Justice.

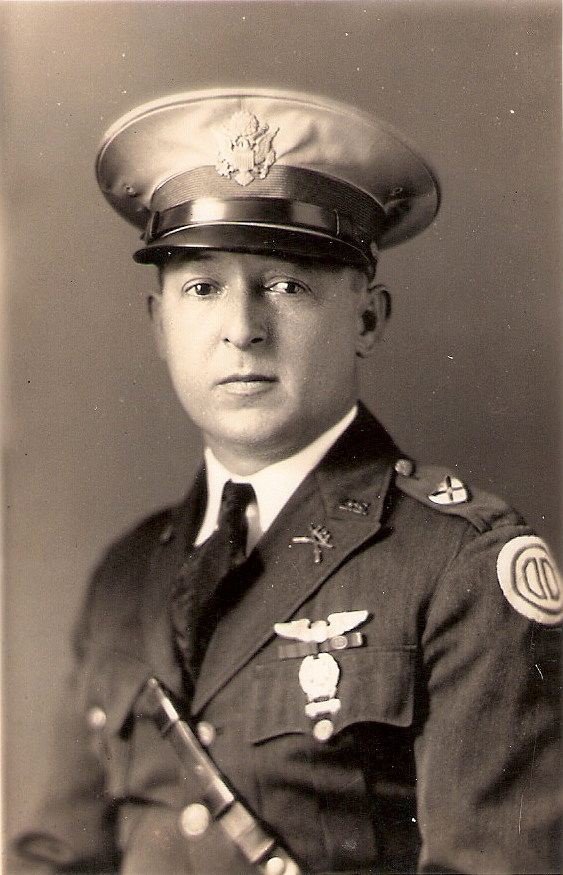
CPT Hugh L. Mays, Company M, 124th Infantry, 1928 - 1/9/1937. Established an appliance business called Mays Electric, now Mays-Munroe, in Tallahassee in 1936. Later commanded First Battalion, Florida State Guard circa 1943-1944

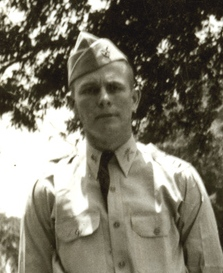
CPT Henry W. McMillan, Company M, 124th Infantry, 1/9/1937 - 1941. Later commanded 51st Infantry Division, and was the Adjutant General of Florida 1961–75. The Tallahassee armory is named in his honor.

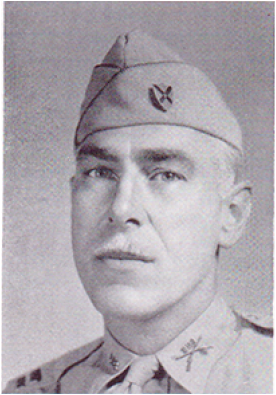
CPT Julius C. Newton, Company M, 124th Infantry, 1941.

CPT Jay Hall, Company M, 124th Infantry, 2/1942 - 1/1943.

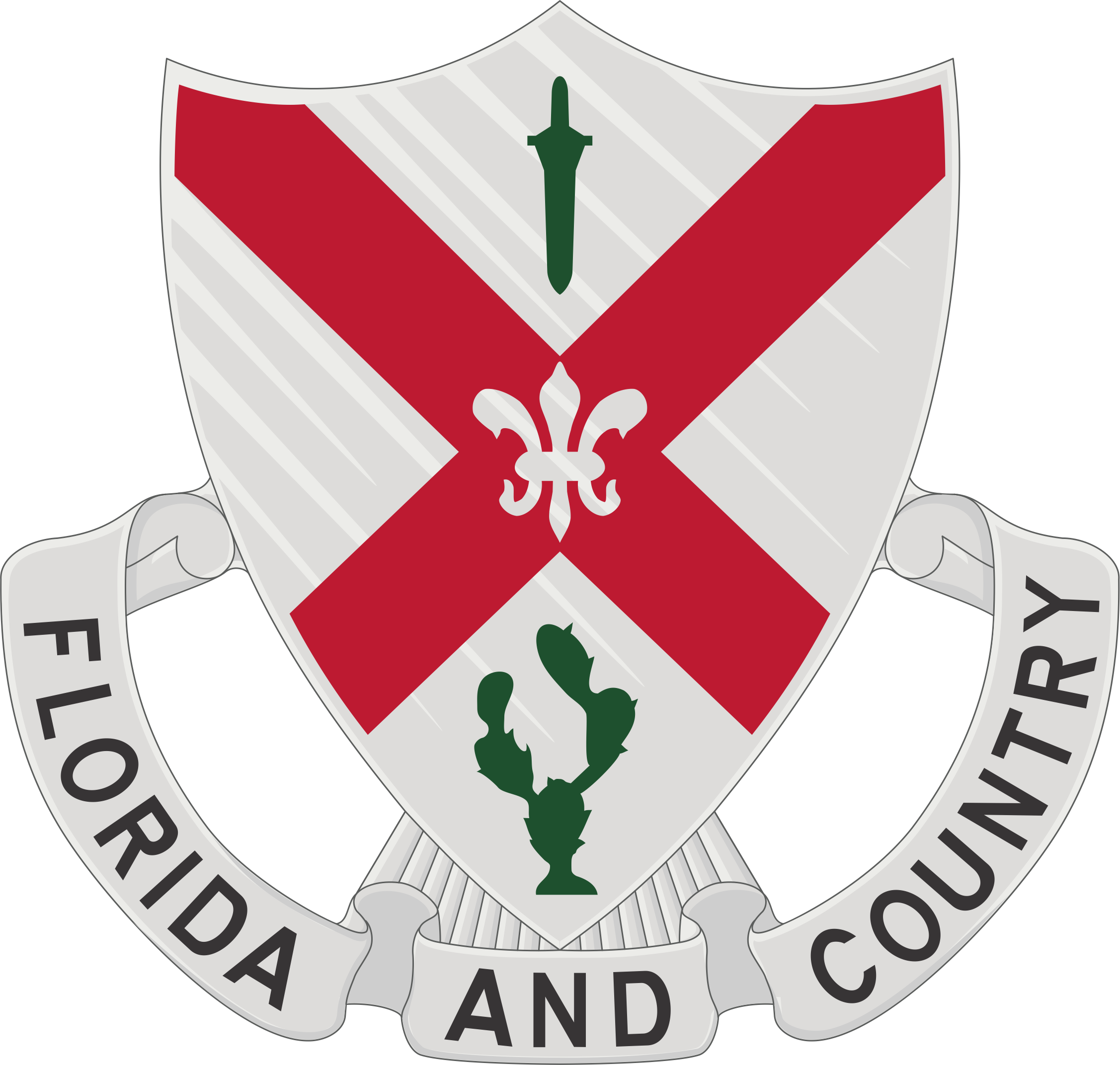
LT Ross H. Calvert, Company M, 124th Infantry, 1943.

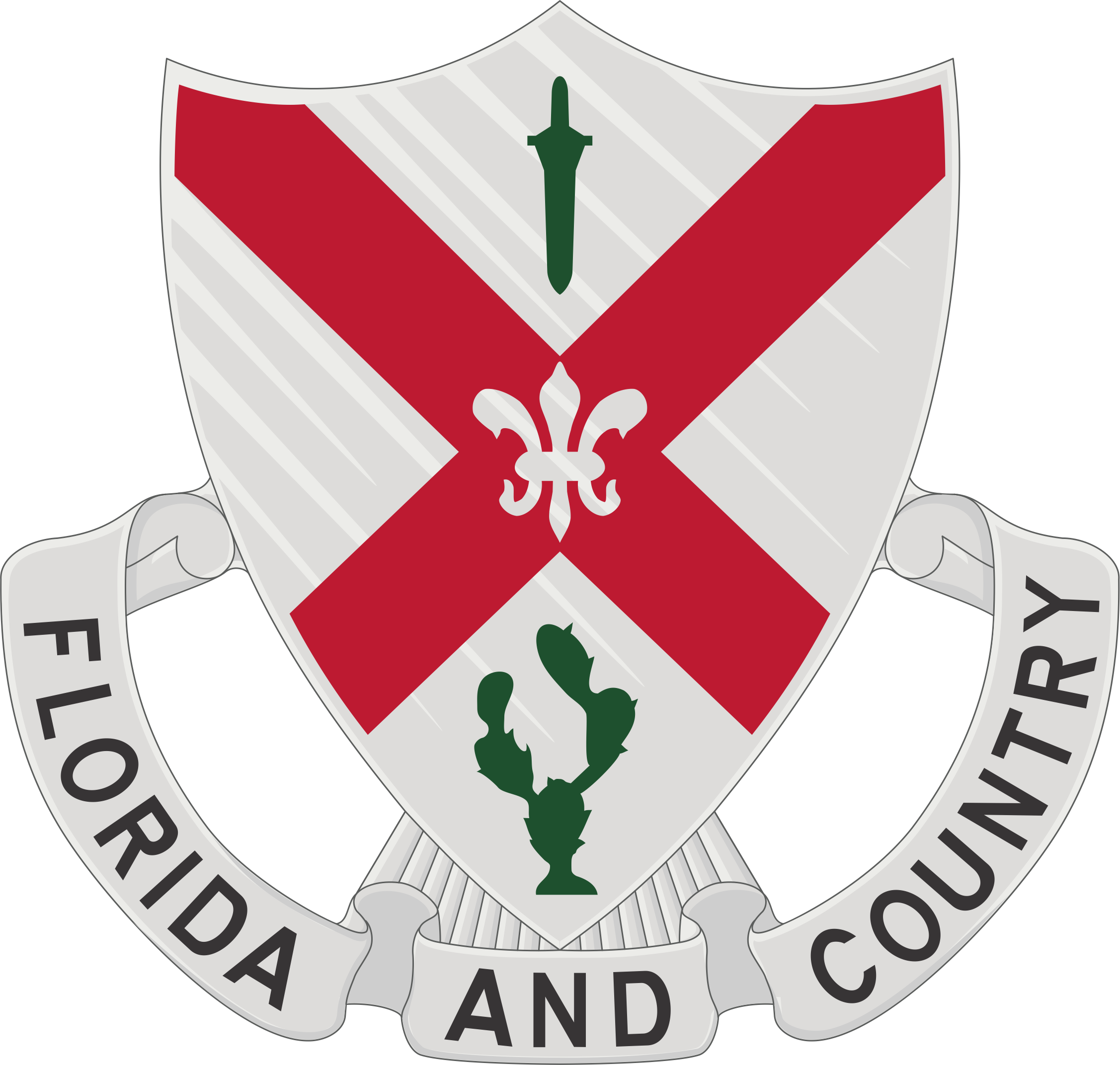
LT Thomas Jones, Company M, 124th Infantry, 1943.

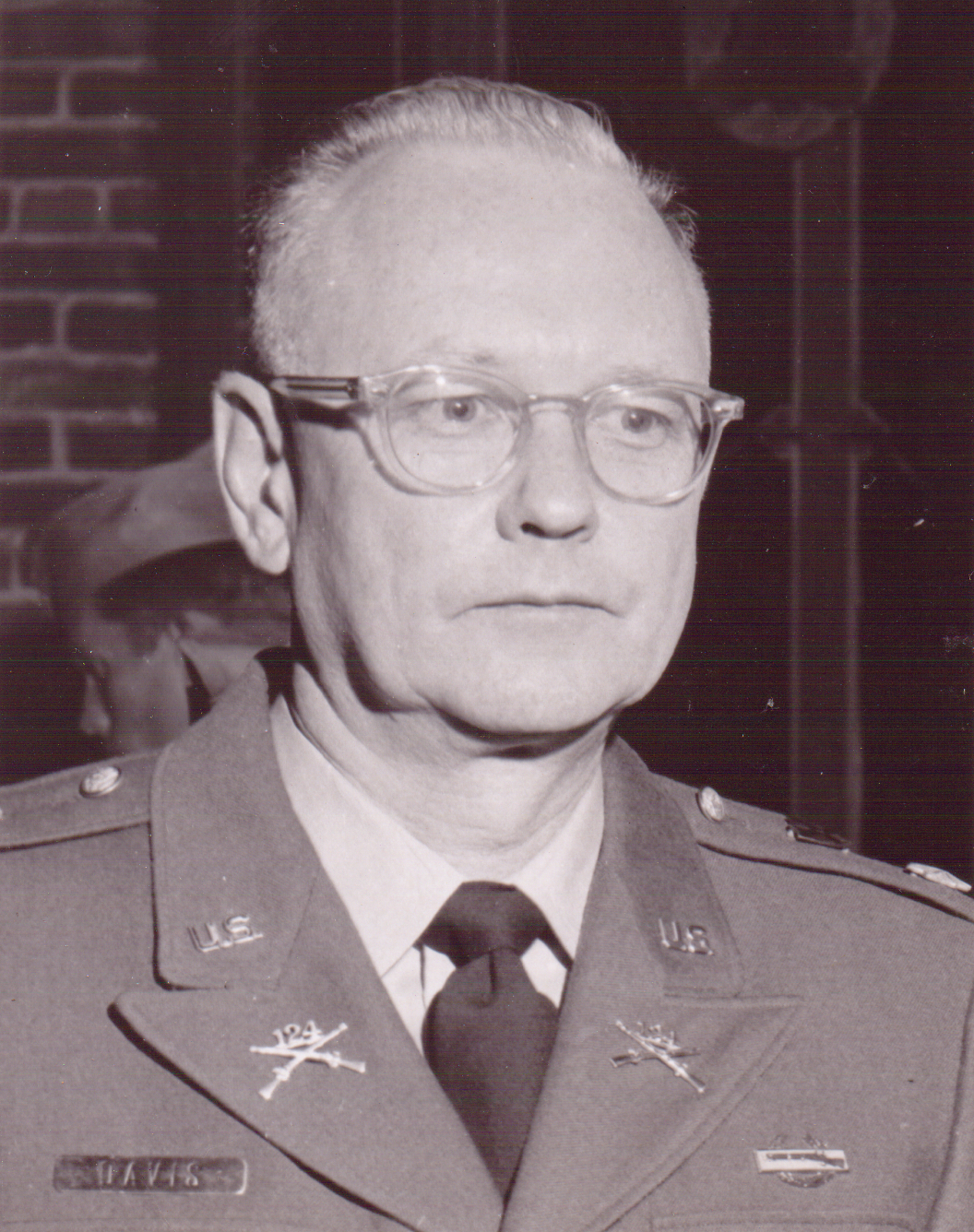
1LT Ralph C. Davis, Company A, 124th Infantry, 1/22/1947 - 2/16/1949. Later commanded 1st Armored Rifle Battalion, 124th Infantry; 260th Engineer Group; and 53rd Infantry Brigade. Retired brigadier general.

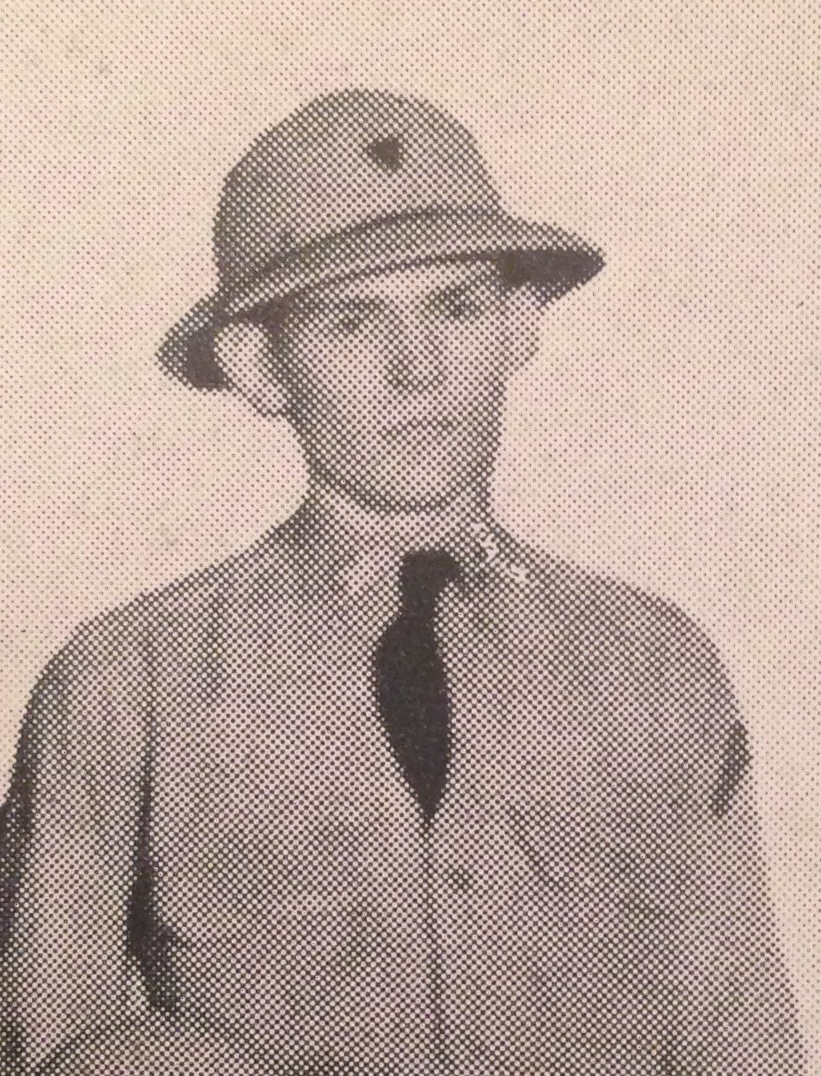
CPT William H. Mapoles, Company A, 124th Infantry, 2/16/1949 - 10/12/1949.

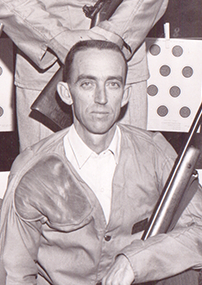
CPT Russell W. Buckhalt, Company A, 124th Infantry, 10/12/1949 - 9/12/1950.

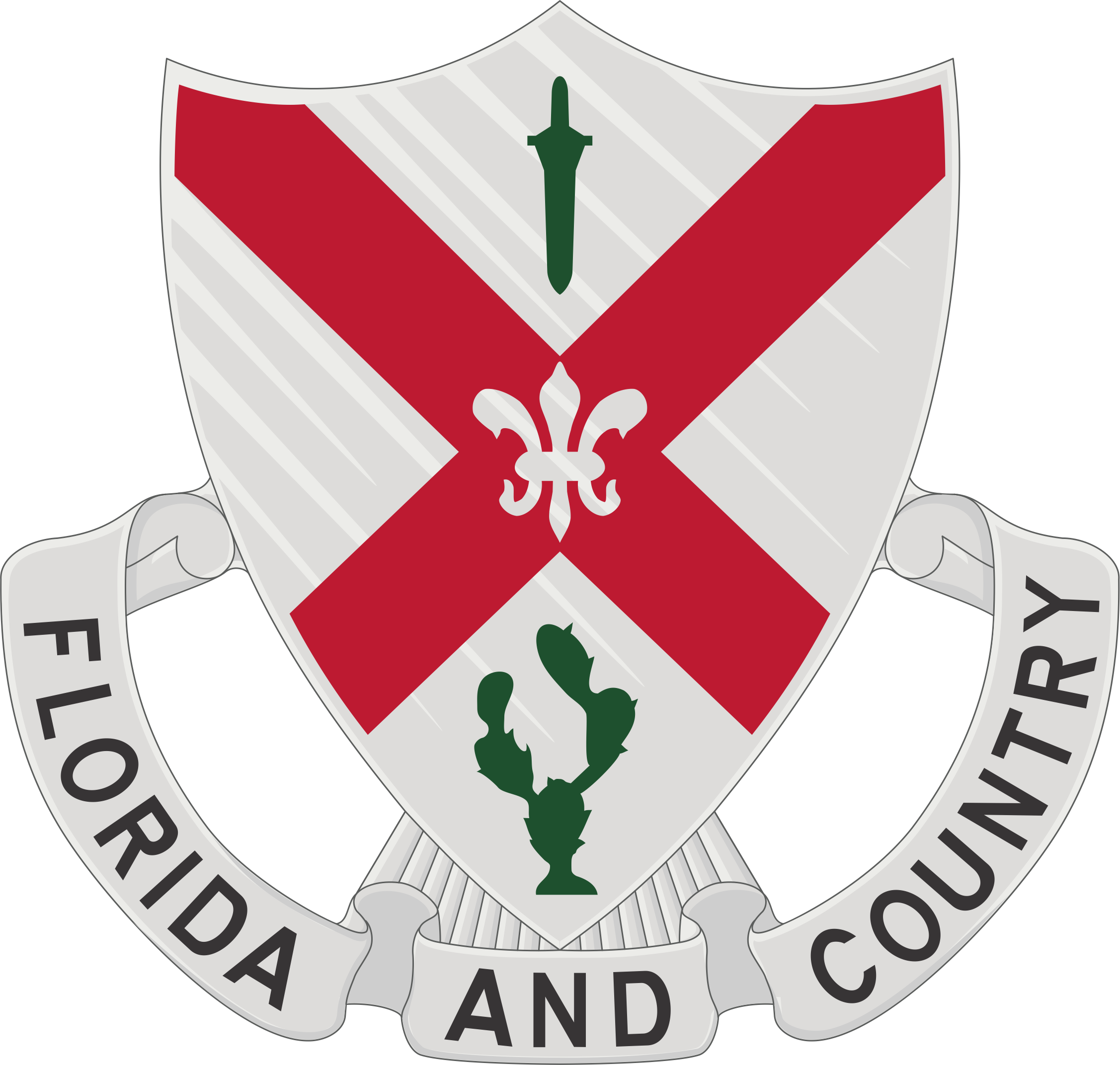
CPT Vernon C. Atkinson, Company A, 124th Infantry, 9/12/1950 - 1/6/1951.

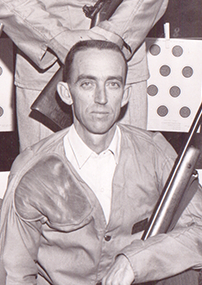
CPT Russell W. Buckhalt, Company A, 124th Infantry, 1/6/1951 - 2/19/1952.

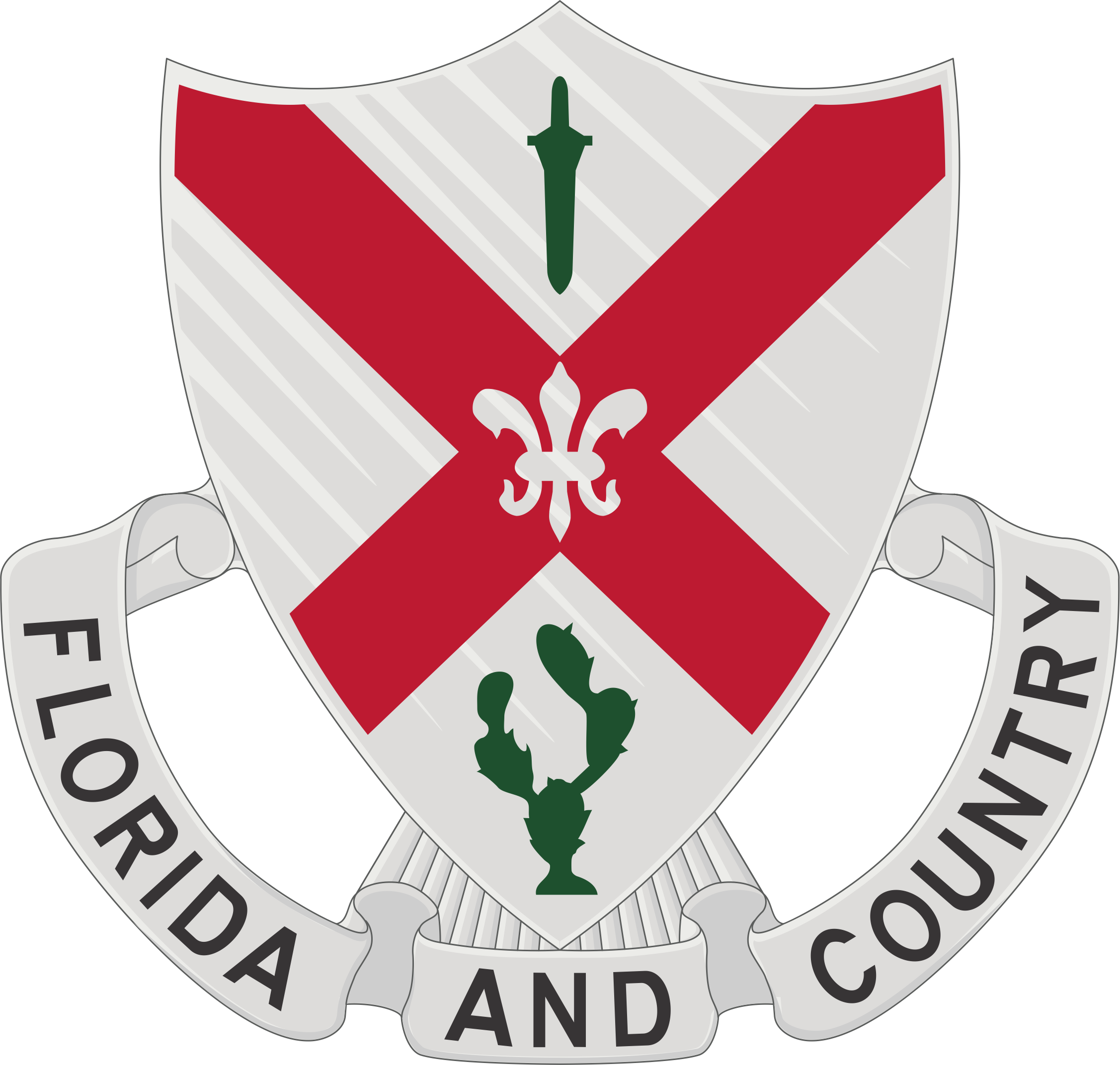
LT Evert Heath, Company A, 124th Infantry, 2/19/1952 - 4/4/1952.

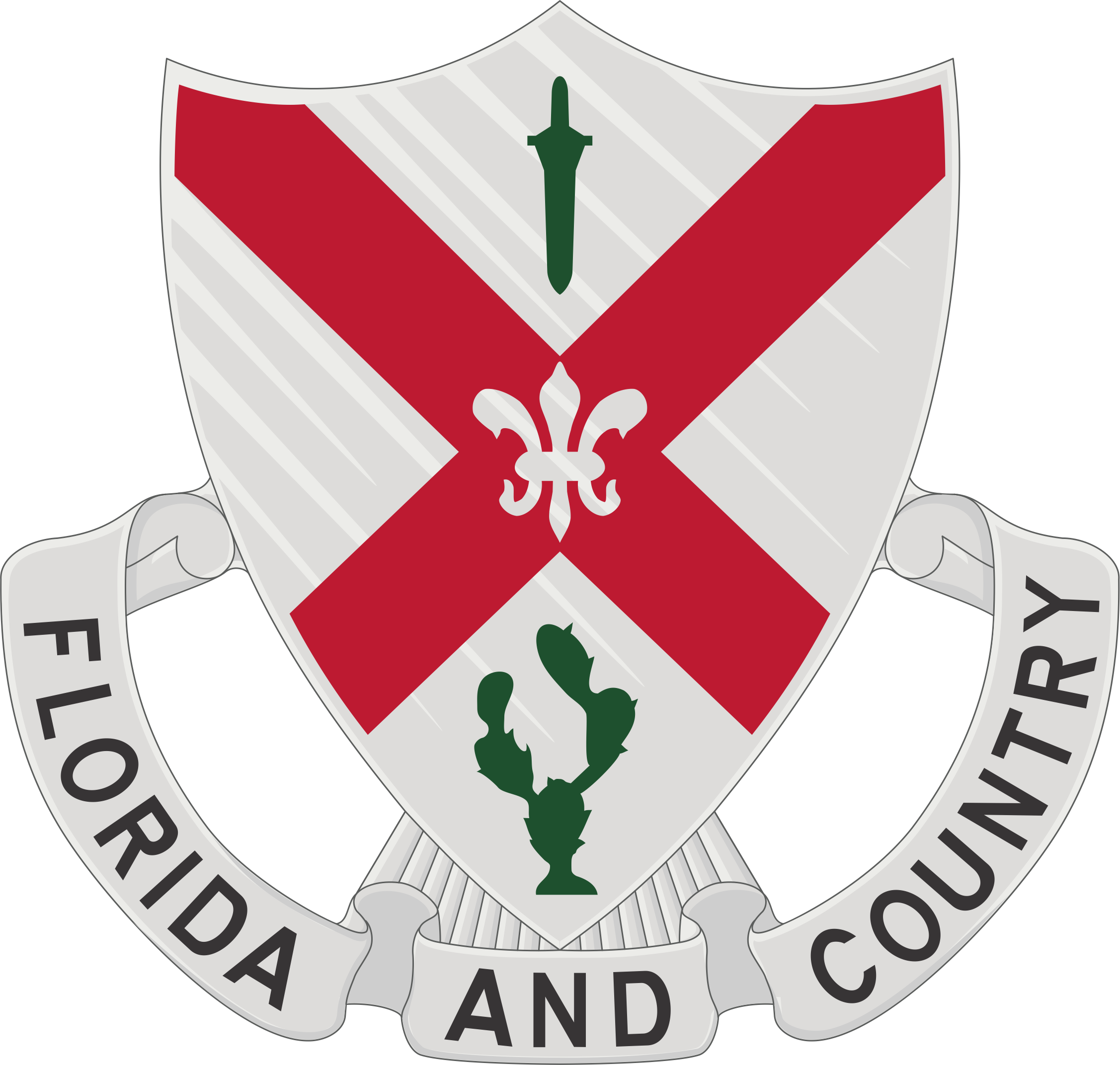
LT Elex Z. Nicholson, Company A, 124th Infantry, 4/4/1952 - 3/27/1953.

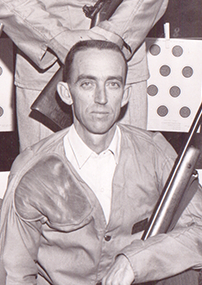
CPT Russell W. Buckhalt, Headquarters Company, 1st Armored Rifle Battalion, 124th Infantry, 3/27/1953 - 1/1958.

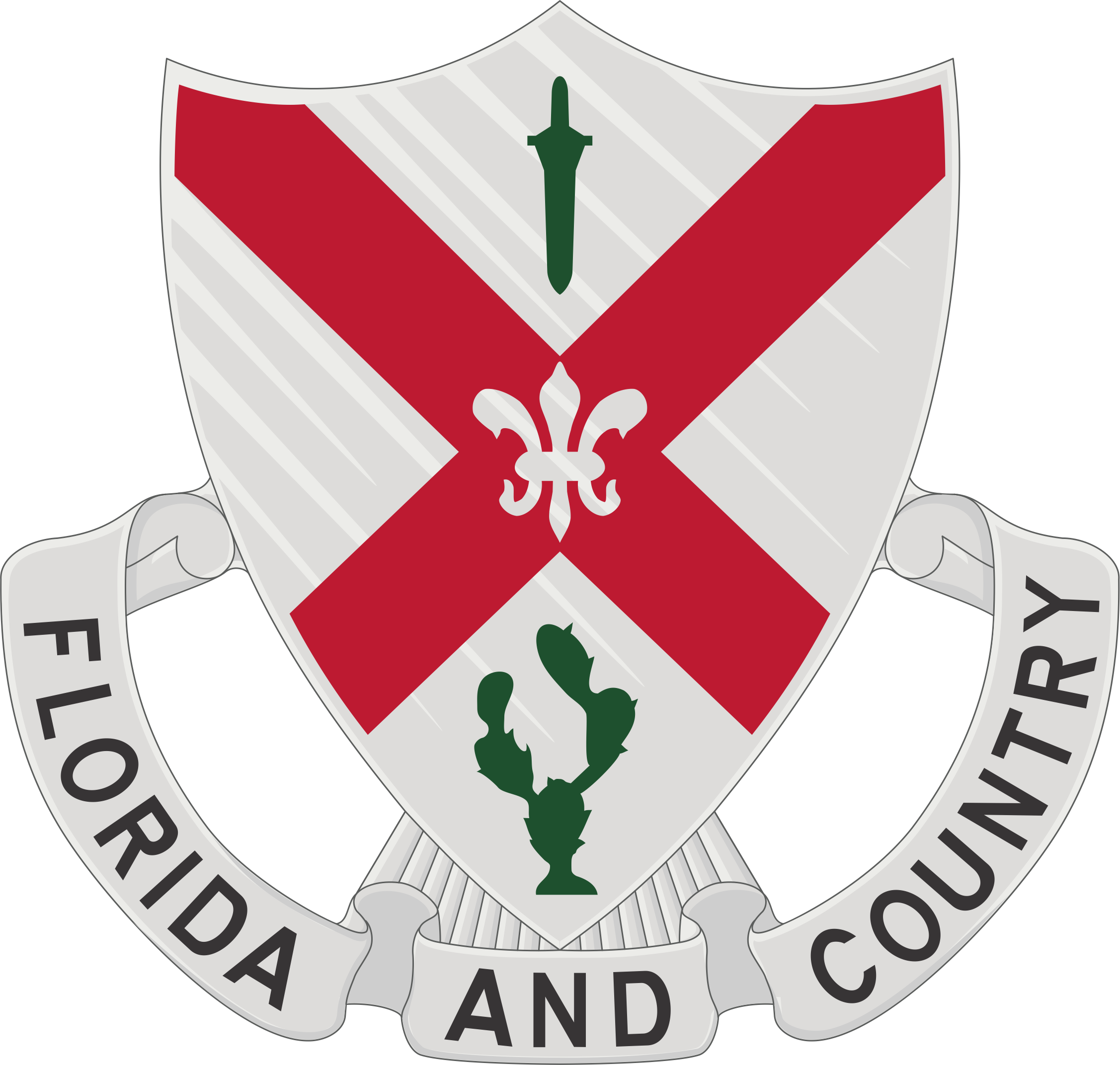
CPT William B. Langley, Headquarters Company, 1st Armored Rifle Battalion, 124th Infantry, 1/1958 - 11/1/1959.

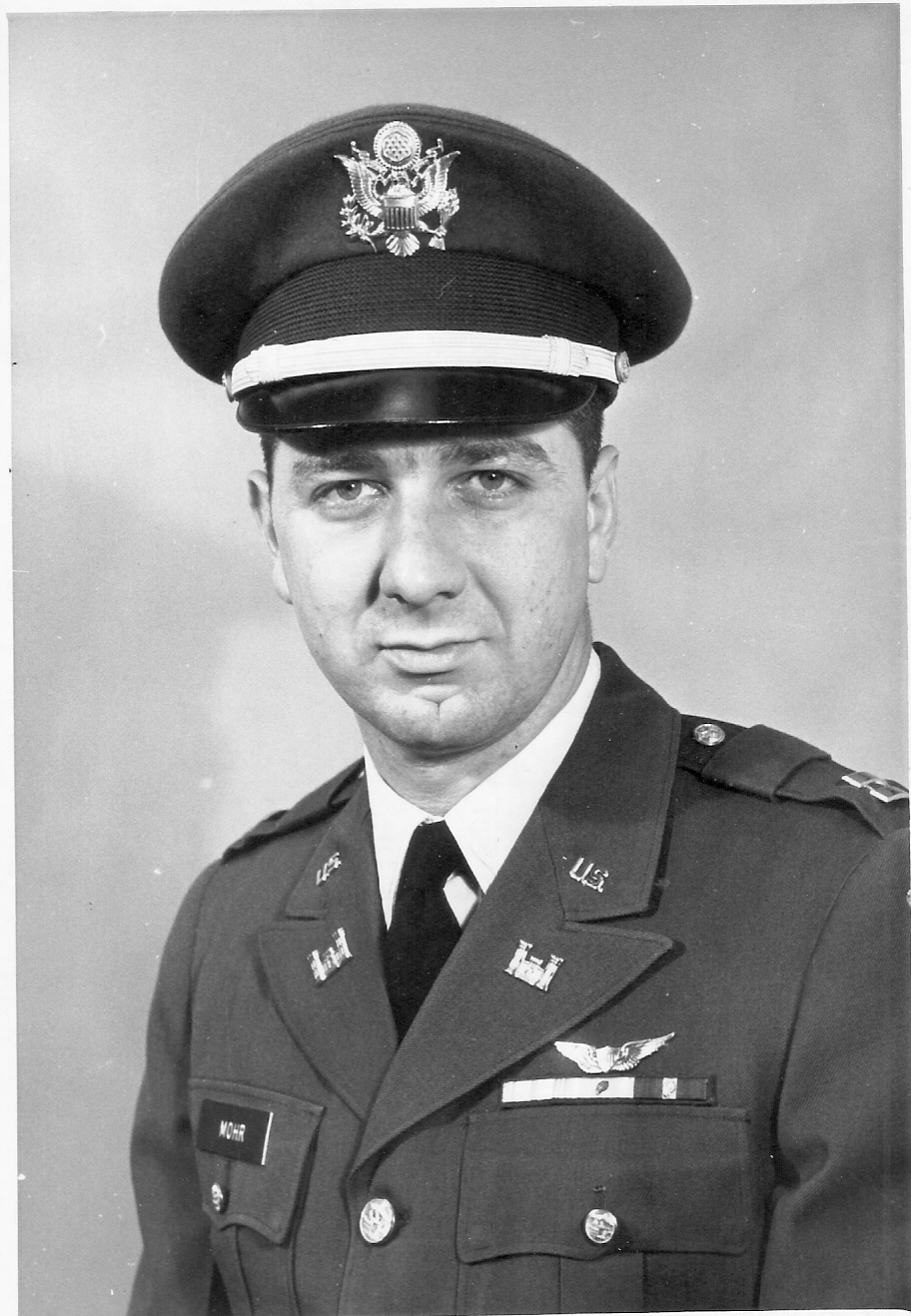
CPT Charles G. Mohr, 11/1/1959 – 3/2/1964, Headquarters Company, 1st Armored Rifle Battalion, 124th Infantry. After reorganization, CPT Mohr commanded Company C, 261st Engineer Battalion (Combat).

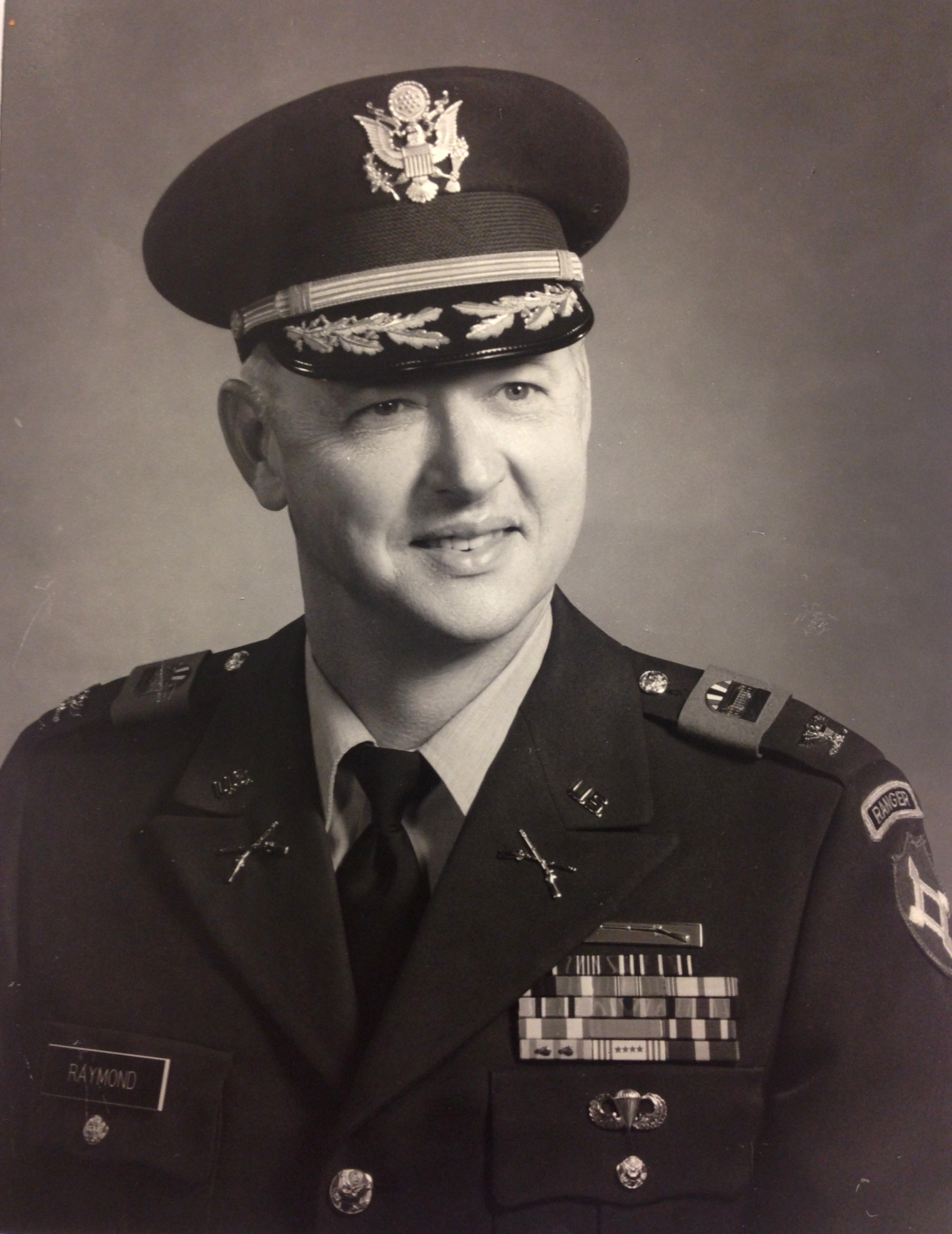
CPT Harry J. Raymond, 3/2/1964.

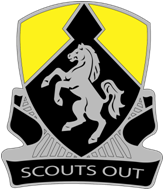
CPT William B. Nunn, 1964 - 1969.

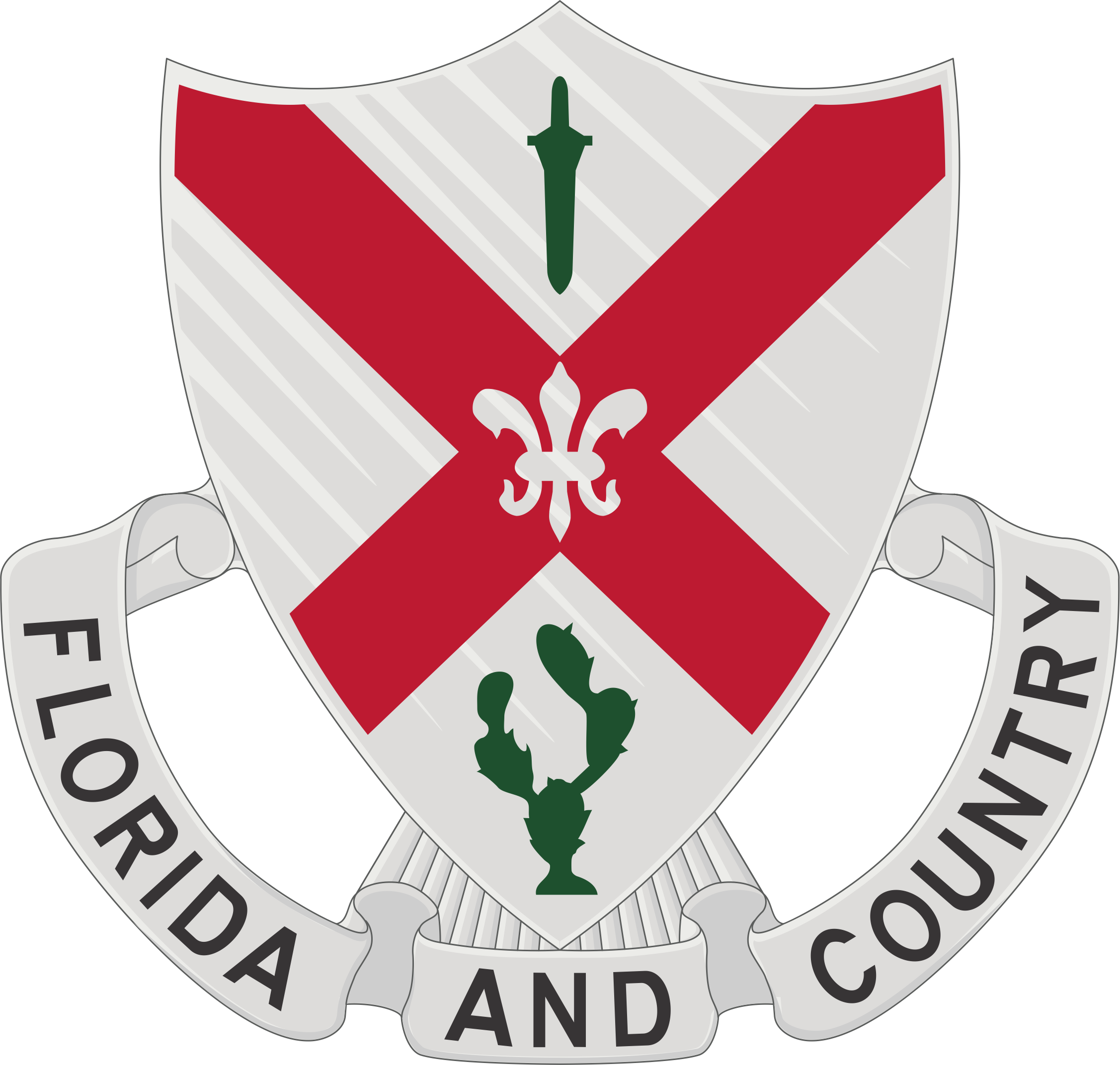
CPT George C. Brand, Jr., Company A, 3-124 Infantry, 10/7/1971 - 1973.

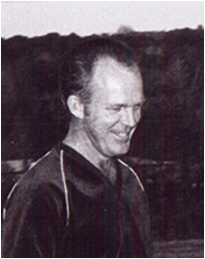
CPT Richard G. Kirkland, A Company, 3-124 Infantry, 1983

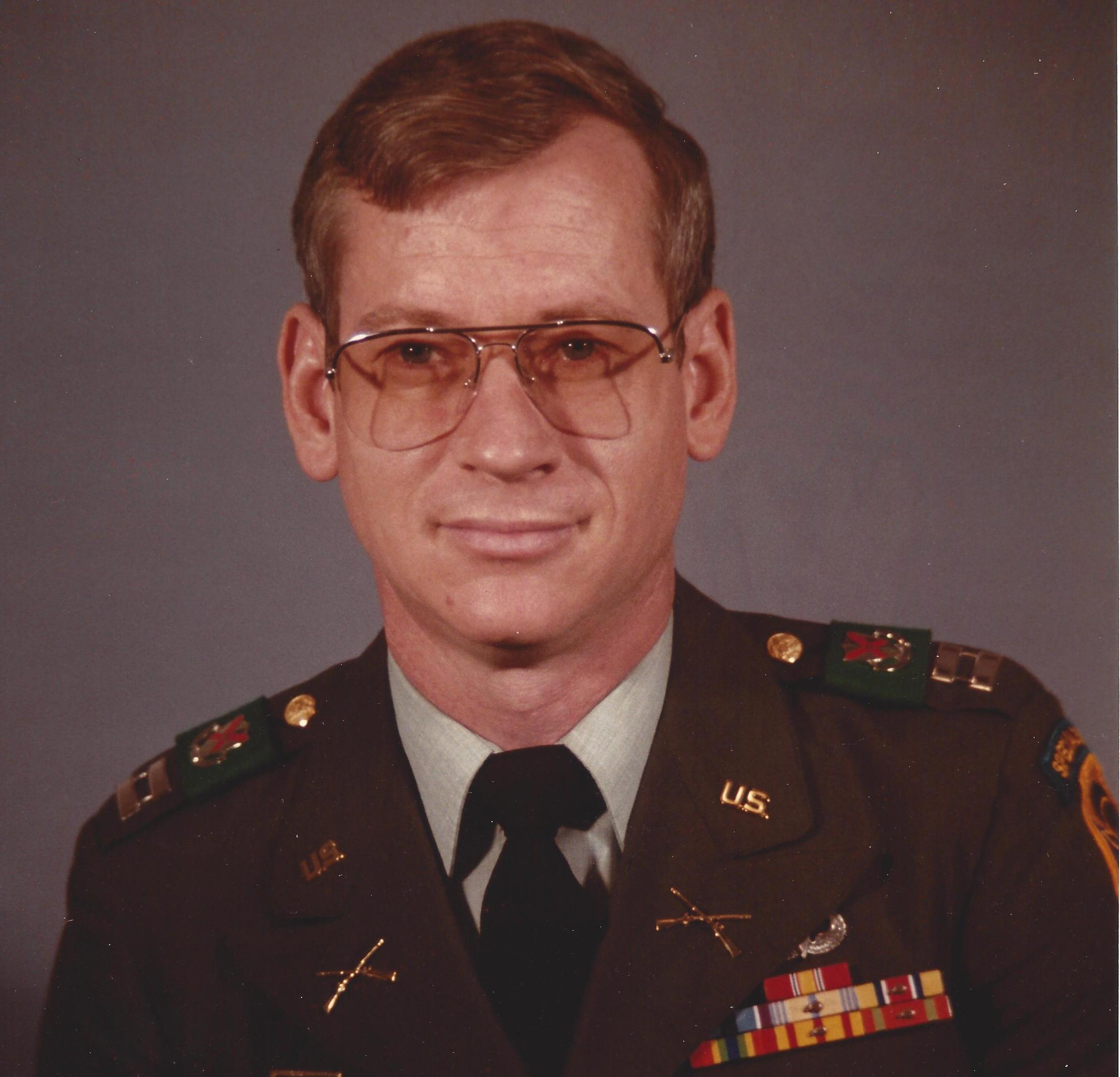
CPT Gynn Beach, Commanded Company A, 3-124 Infantry, 1986.

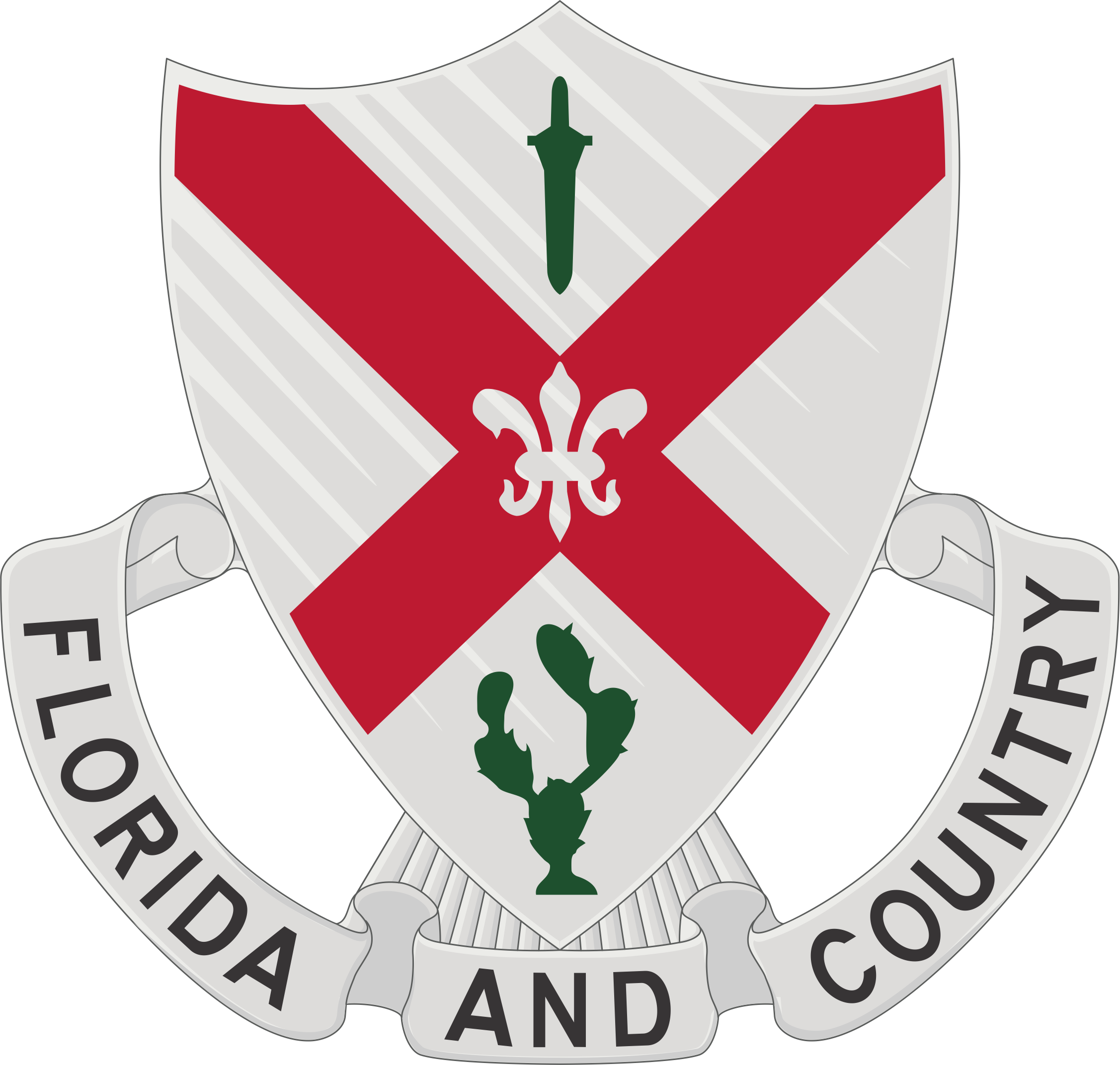
CPT Daniel T. Buchanan, Company A, 3-124 Infantry, - 1992.

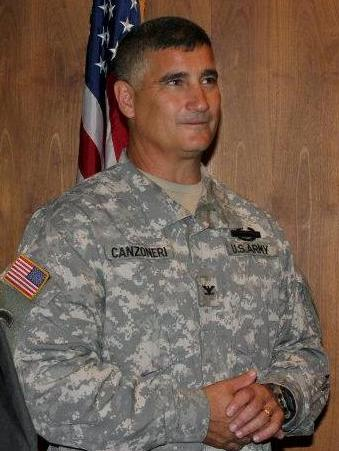
CPT Mike Canzoneri, Company A, 3-124 Infantry, 1992 – 1995; later commanded 1-153 Cavalry and the 53rd IBCT.

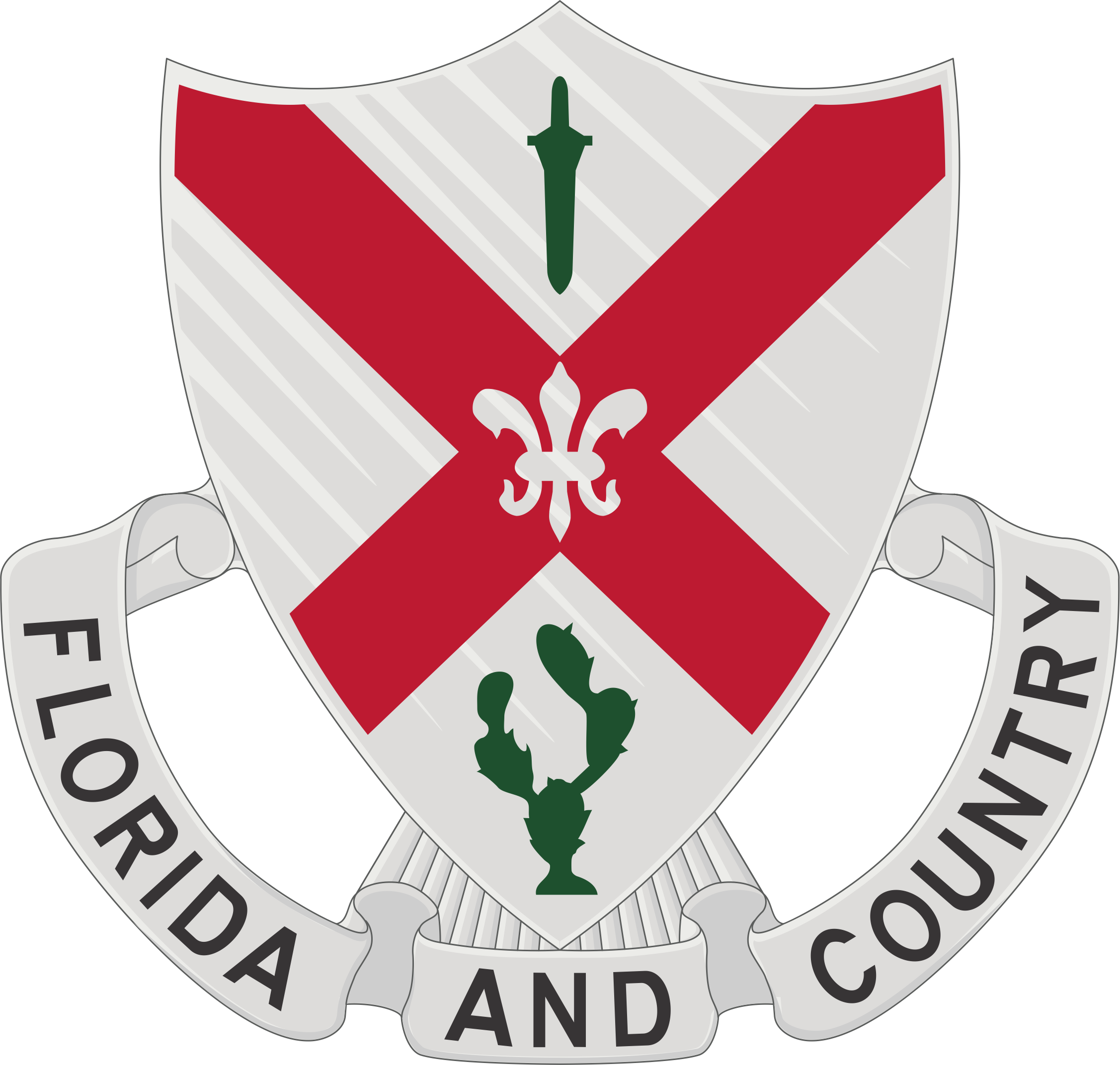
CPT David L. Johnson, Company A, 3-124 Infantry, 1995 – 1997.

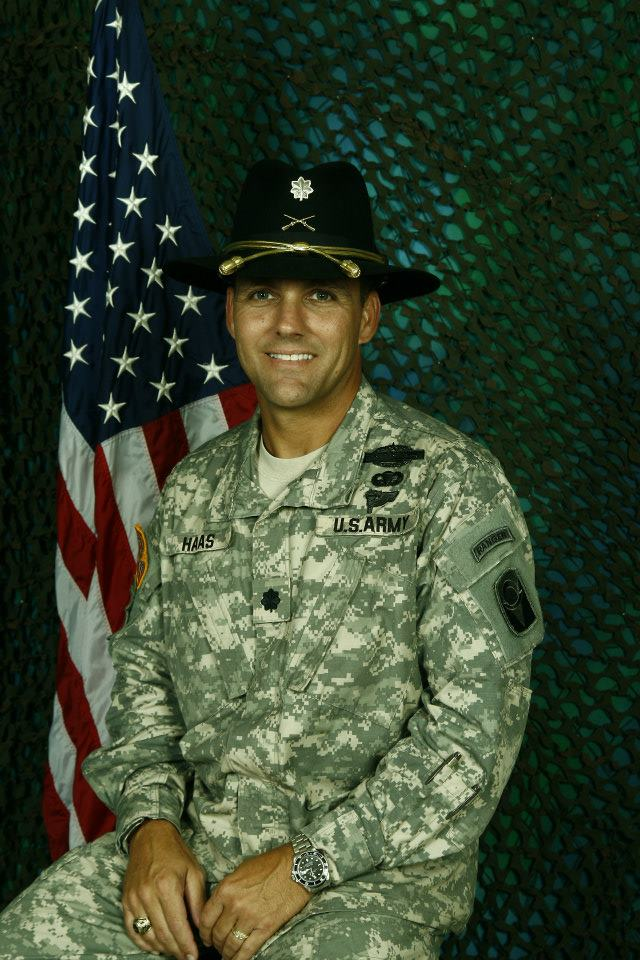
CPT John D. Haas, Company A, 3-124 Infantry, 1997 - 1999; later commanded 1-153 Cavalry and the 53rd IBCT. Now a Major General, he is the current Adjutant General of Florida.

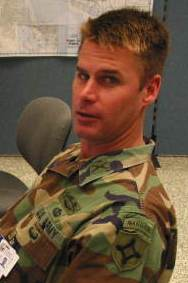
1LT Michael T. Warfel, Company A, 3-124 Infantry, 1999 - 2000.

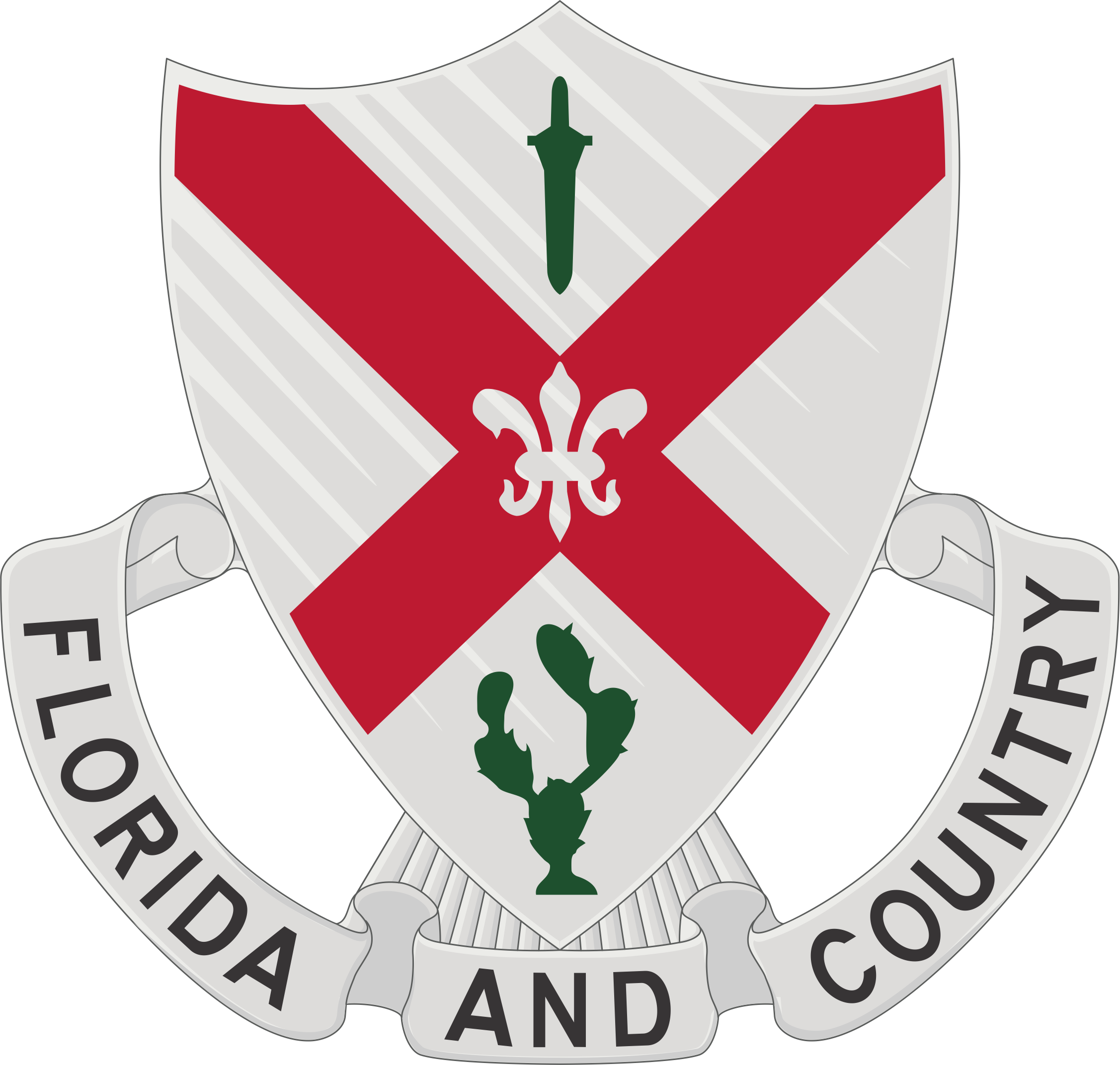
CPT Bobby B. Aliberti, Company A, 3-124 Infantry, 2000 – 2002.

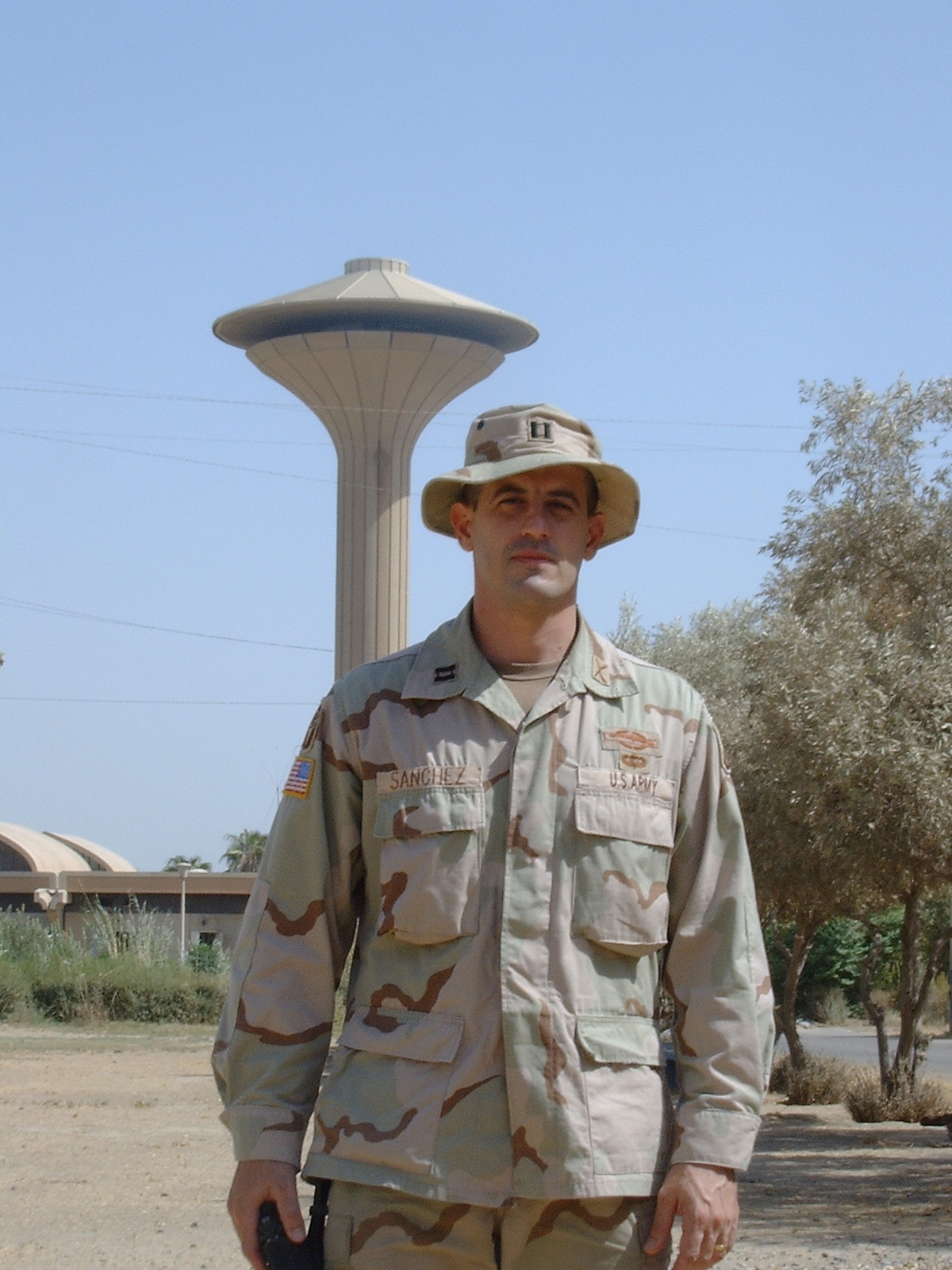
CPT Rodney A. Sanchez, A Company, 3-124 Infantry, 2002–04, deployed Company A to Iraq.

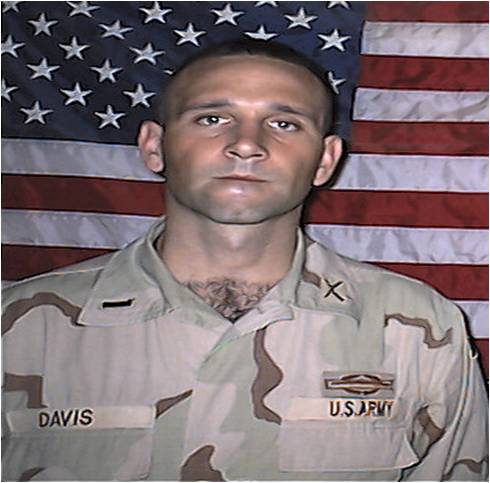
1LT Levy T. Davis, Company A, 3-124 Infantry, 2004 – 2005.

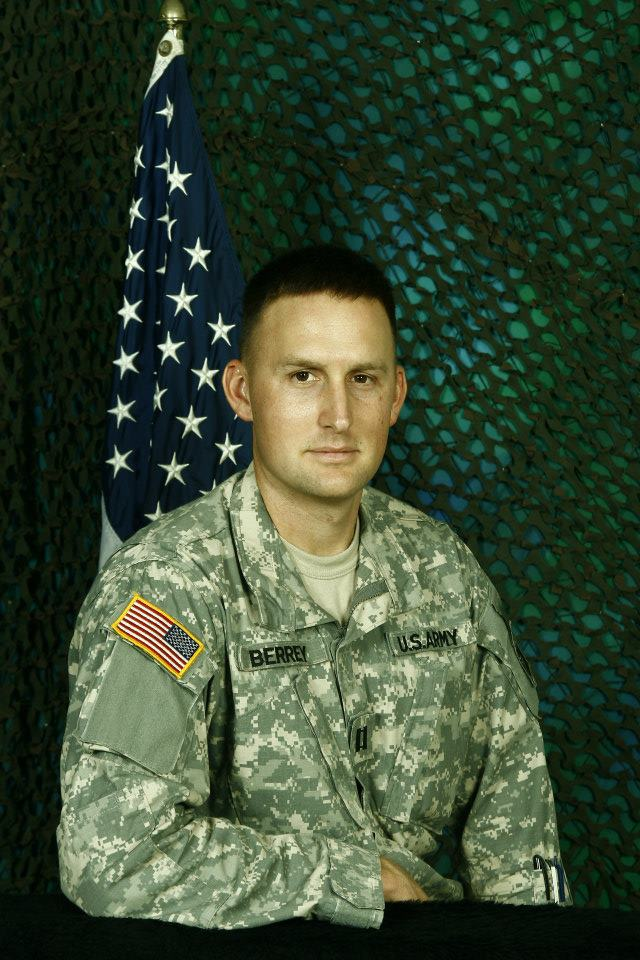
CPT Samuel A. Berrey, Company A, 3-124 Infantry, 2005 – 2007.

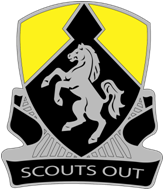
CPT Robert K. Greene, Troop C, 1-153 Cavalry, 2007 – 2008.

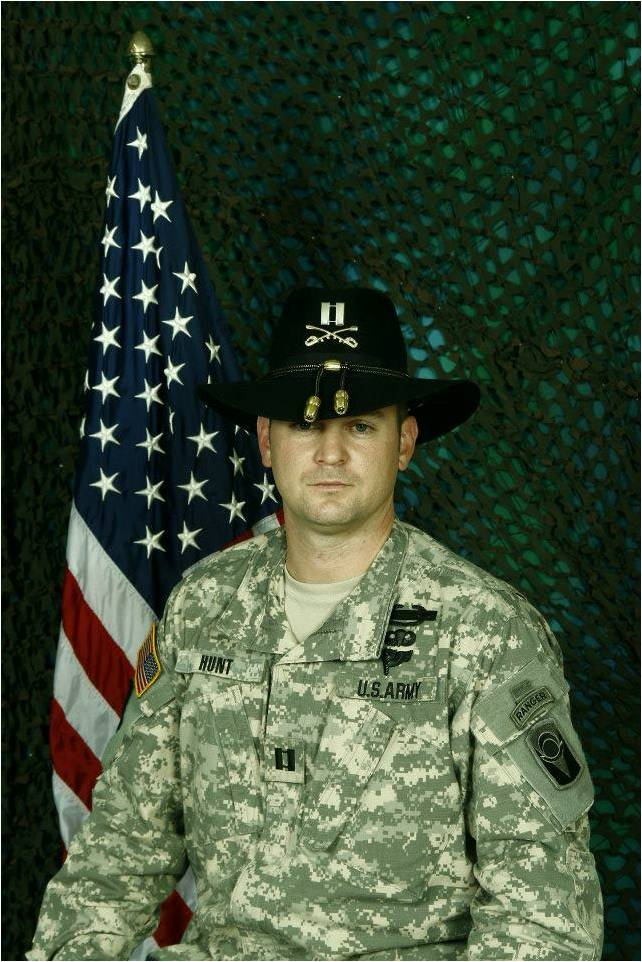
CPT Jason M. Hunt, Troop C, 1-153 Cavalry, 2008 – 2011, deployed Troop C to Kuwait.

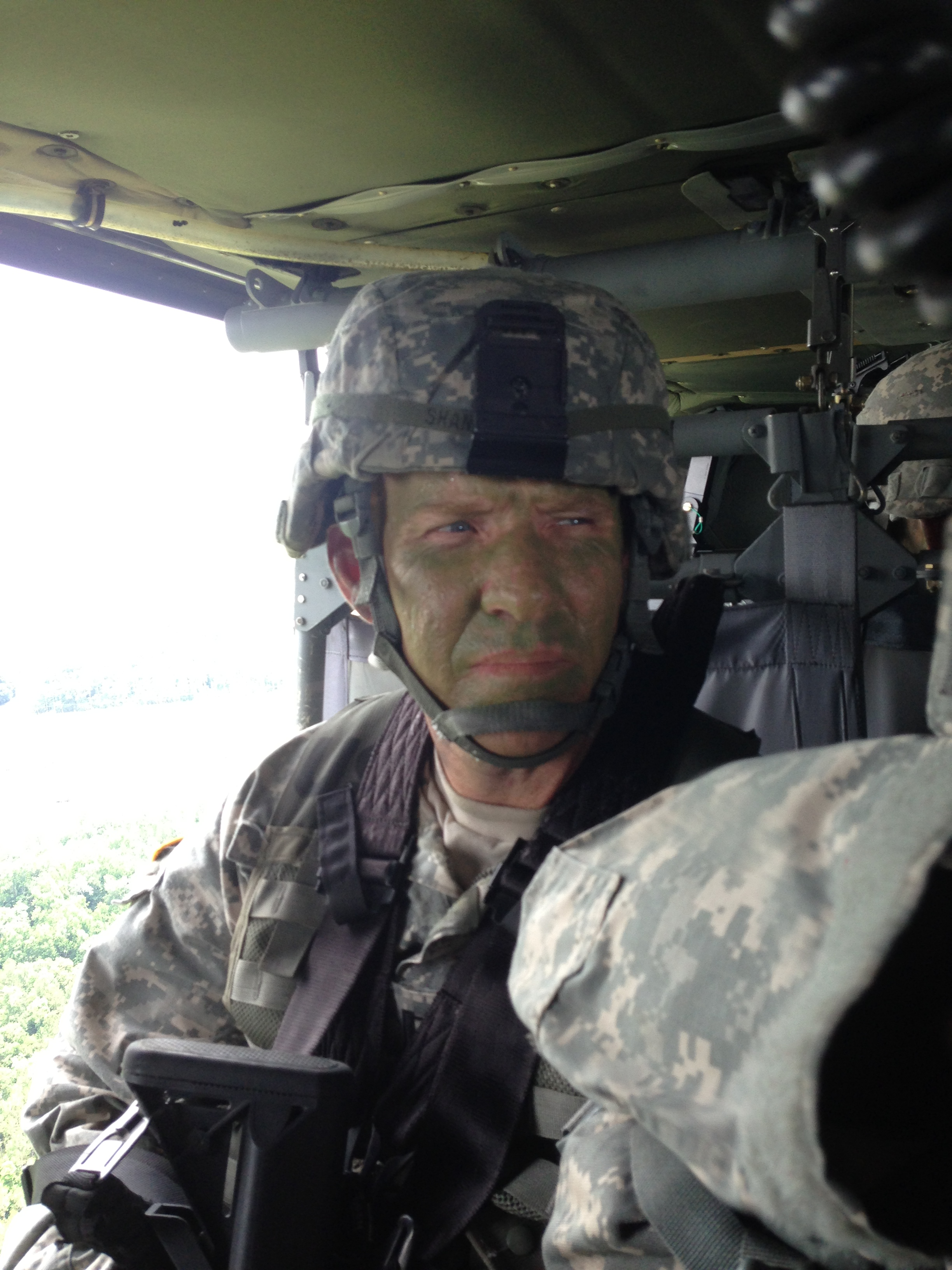
CPT Matthew M. Shank, Troop C, 1-153 Cavalry, 2011 – 2013.

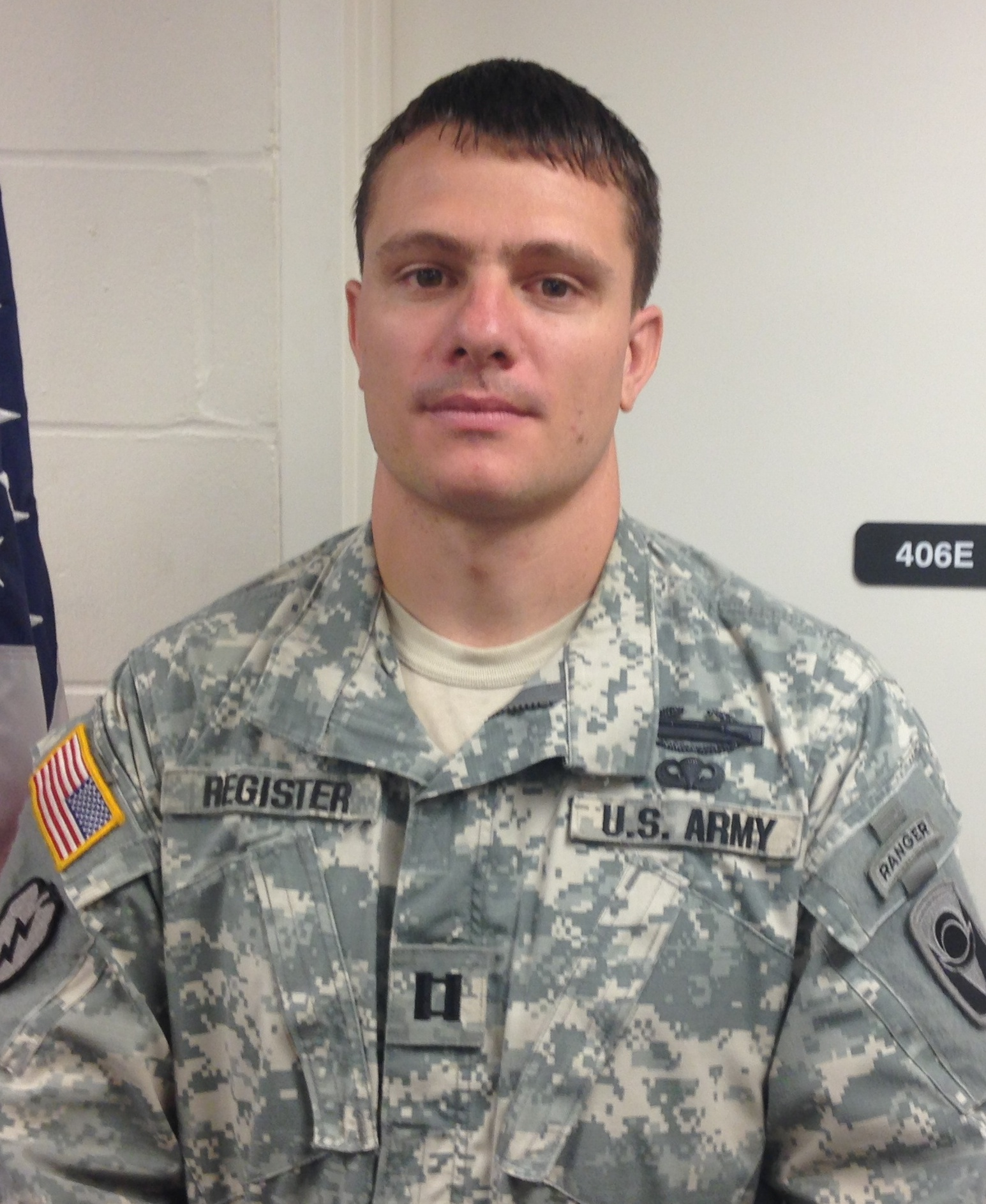
CPT Joseph T. Register, Troop C, 1-153 Cavalry, 9/2013 - 10/4/2014.

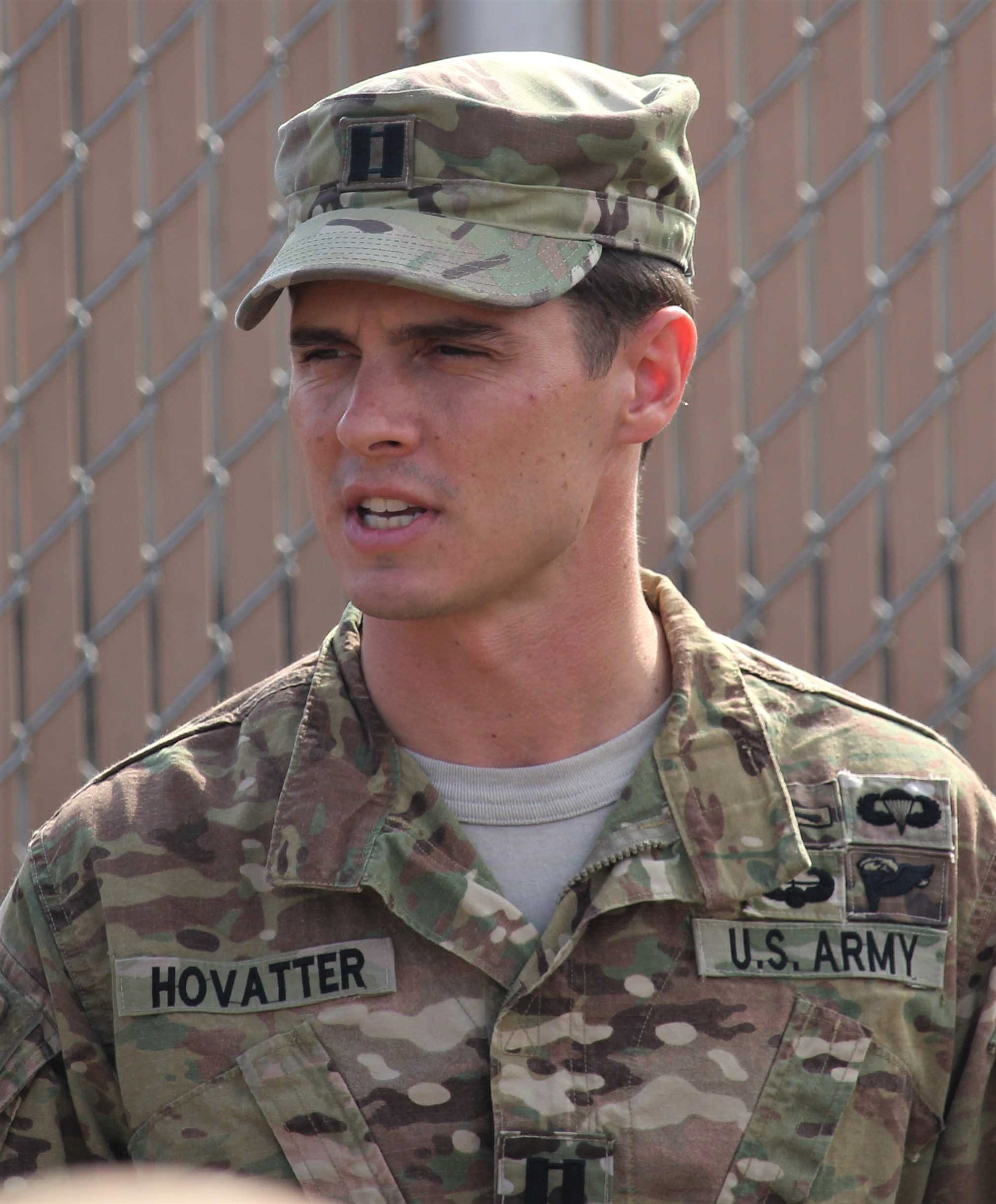
CPT Ryan P. Hovatter, Troop C, 1-153 Cavalry, 10/4/2014 – 4/1/2015, left C Troop command to command Company B, 2-124 Infantry in Djibouti.

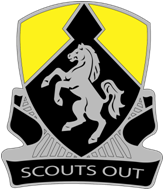
CPT Nicolas A. Vasquez, Troop C, 1-153 Cavalry, 4/1/2014 – 10/21/2016.

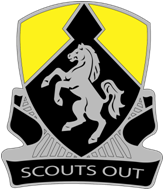
CPT Jacob F. Wielock, Troop C, 1-153 Cavalry, 10/21/2016 – 2019.

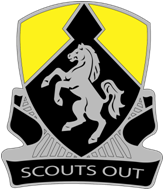
CPT Shaun Fitzgerald, Troop C, 1-153 Cavalry, 2019 – 12/2020.

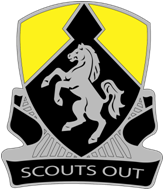
CPT Johnny McDonald, Troop C, 1-153 Cavalry, 12/2020 – 12/2022.

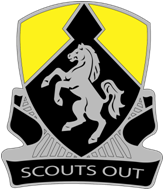
CPT John Recordon, Troop C, 1-153 Cavalry, 12/2022 – Present.

== See also ==
- Franklin Guards
- Florida Civil War Confederate Units
