= Howard Kester =

American preacher (1904–1977)

Howard Kester (1904–1977) was an American preacher, organizer, and activist based in the South. He is noted for his work organizing the Southern Tenant Farmers Union (STFU) beginning in 1934. His work was inspired by a radical version of Christianity called the Social Gospel, influenced by Reinhold Niebuhr among others, as well as a Marxist critique of the Southern economy. A white Southerner, he believed that it was important to end racial strife by uniting poor black and whites around a common cause.

His views on race had been influenced as a college student by a tour of Poland with the YMCA. After visiting a Jewish ghetto, he began to see a parallel between Europe's treatment of Jews and America's treatment of blacks. Kester worked with numerous organizations throughout his life that sought racial justice in the United States: the NAACP, Fellowship of Reconciliation, Fellowship of Southern Churchmen, and the Committee on Economic and Racial Justice. He investigated the Claude Neal case.

In 1936, he published Revolt Among the Sharecroppers, a short work on behalf of the STFU. It was reprinted by Arno in 1969, and issued in a new edition in 1997 by the University of Tennessee Press.

== Biography ==
Howard "Buck" Kester was born in 1904 and spent the first twelve years of his life living in the outskirts of Martinsville, Virginia. His father, a tailor, moved the family to Beckley, West Virginia; a coal mining town. Industrial growth in Beckley intensified the gap between the working and middle class, which benefited more by industry. African Americans were drawn to the area in search of work. In the early 20th century, the Ku Klux Klan had a revival, representing itself as a fraternal organization, and Kester's own father joined. This environment gave Kester firsthand knowledge of class and race inequality.

During the 1920s, Kester worked as a Christian activist for the YMCA and the Fellowship of Reconciliation. In the late 1920s, Kester enrolled in the divinity school of Vanderbilt University in Nashville, Tennessee. Under the partnership and influence of Alva Taylor, Kester and other Christian socialists, developed what historian Anthony Dunbar calls a "radical gospel" that sought to improve economic conditions in the South.

As the Great Depression took effect, they wanted to help the South's dispossessed sharecroppers, textile and mine workers, and unemployed among both blacks and whites. In 1936 Kester published Revolt Among the Sharecroppers, a short work prepared on behalf of the Southern Tenant Farmers Union. It was republished in 1969 and 1997.

In October 1934, Kester represented the NAACP in investigating the murder of Lola Cannady in Marianna, Florida, for which Claude Neal, a young African-American man, had been arrested. Neal was brutally lynched in a terrorist spectacle a few days after the murder, before any trial could take place. Afterward the aroused mob attacked up to 200 blacks on the streets and in their businesses, rioting, looting and burning in the black part of town. The governor had to call in the National Guard to restore order in Jackson County.

Howard Kester worked as the secretary for the Fellowship of Southern Churchmen from 1934 until 1944, and again from 1952 to 1957. He also worked at Penn Center, in the South Carolina Sea Islands, in the late 1940s.
