= Lynching of Claude Neal =

African American who was lynched in the U.S.

Claude Neal (b. 1911 – d. October 26, 1934) was a 23-year-old African-American farmhand who was arrested in Jackson County, Florida, on October 19, 1934, for allegedly raping and killing Lola Cannady, a 19-year-old white woman missing since the preceding night. Circumstantial evidence was collected against him, but nothing directly linked him to the crime. When the news got out about his arrest, white lynch mobs began to form. In order to keep Neal safe, County Sheriff Flake Chambliss moved him between multiple jails, including the county jail at Brewton, Alabama, 100 miles (160 km) away. But a lynch mob of about 100 white men from Jackson County heard where he was, and brought him back to Jackson County.

The time and place of the lynching were provided to the news media in advance and reported on nationwide, attracting a huge crowd. The spectacle lynching had been announced to take place at the Cannady farm, but the crowd had grown unruly, and a smaller group murdered Neal in secret. He was tortured and mutilated before being hanged by the instigators at a site along the Chattahoochee River, near Greenwood, Florida. They tied his body to the back of their truck and dragged his corpse to the Cannady farm, where a white crowd estimated at 2,000 attacked the corpse by stabbing it with sticks and knives. Later that night Neal's body was hanged from a tree in the courthouse square. When the sheriff discovered it in the morning, he cut it down.

A large group of white people went to the courthouse in Marianna, demanding that the body be hanged again so they could see it. When the sheriff refused, they began rioting, assaulting the courthouse, attacking black people in the area, injuring 200, and looting and burning houses. The body was displayed on the courthouse steps so that anyone interested could see it.

In the next few days, white people rioted in an attempt to drive black people from the county, injuring an estimated 200 persons, including two police, and destroying black-owned property. Eventually, Governor David Sholtz called in more than 100 troops of the National Guard to suppress the white rioting.

== Murder of Lola Cannady ==
Lola Cannady (also spelled Cannidy), a 19-year-old white woman from a farming family, was missing on the evening of Thursday, October 18, 1934, after going to a water pump to water the family's hogs. Friends and neighbors helped the Cannady family in their search for Lola in the fields behind the family's land. At 6:30 A.M. the next day, they found her body poorly hidden in the woods, under the cover of two logs and a pine tree branch. Cannady had been bludgeoned to death with a hammer that had been taken from the Cannady field. She may have been raped.

County Sheriff Flake Chambliss became focused on two suspects: Claude Neal, a 23-year-old black farmworker who lived about a quarter mile away, and Calvin Cross, who was white. Sheriff Chambliss had received reports that Neal had been in the field near the same water pump that Lola had gone to and that he was gone for about two hours before going home. Neal and Cannady had known each other since childhood; there were some suggestions that they were lovers. Neal was arrested about two hours after the discovery of Cannady's body.

Because the evidence gathered against Neal was circumstantial at best, it was not enough to prove that he was guilty of the crime. The evidence included bloody clothes that were found at the home he shared with his mother, as well as a bloody piece of fabric which Sheriff Chambliss claimed fit a tear in Neal's shirt. Neal reportedly had cuts on his hands and was inconsistent in his descriptions as to where they had come from; he gave three different explanations for the cuts, with one being that he had gotten them while fixing a fence, one being that he had cut his hands in a fight, and one being that he had cut them jumping a fence. In addition, Neal was missing a ring on his pocket watch. A common, standard watch ring had been found near the spot where Cannady had been murdered. No tests were done on the murder weapon to determine if Neal's fingerprints were on it. The sheriff moved Neal's mother Mrs. Annie Smith and aunt Sallie Smith to an undisclosed jail to prevent them from being harmed by a lynch mob. The prosecution told the coroner's jury that the women said they had washed Neal's bloody clothes.

Howard Kester, a white preacher and activist, was investigating the case on behalf of the NAACP. He learned other accounts of Cannady's murder from members of the black community. One was that she had been murdered by a white man, who later asked Neal's mother and aunt to wash his clothes and possibly offered them payment. Another was that a white man from Malone, in Jackson County, had already confessed to killing Cannady, and that he had given Neal money in exchange for trading clothes with him afterward. Neither of these rumors was ever proven, nor was Kester able to discover more helpful evidence. Kester said that perhaps Neal and Cannady had had a secret, consensual love affair. He suggested that maybe Neal had killed her out of anger if their relationship ended. He had no evidence for this, and such an affair was denied by the Cannady family.

== Jailing of Claude Neal ==
Before the coroner's jury had charged Neal and before much evidence had been found, lynch mobs began forming and searching for Neal. Newspapers contributed to agitation by running stories about him as a suspect a day after the crime was discovered. Due to lynch mobs trying to find and capture Neal, the sheriff moved him multiple times to different jails: from the Bay County Jail in Panama City, to Camp Walton, then to Pensacola on the morning of October 20. In Pensacola, Sheriff Herbert E. Gandy did not want to keep him in the Escambia County, Florida jail because it was not believed to be sturdy enough to withstand an attack. A lynch mob had already recently attempted to raid the jail for Neal. Neal was moved briefly to Fort Barrancas at the Pensacola Naval Air Station, before finally being moved to the Escambia County, Alabama jail in Brewton, Alabama. In order to keep Neal's location a secret, he was booked on charges of vagrancy under the alias of John Smith.

On Monday October 22, after being interrogated by Sheriff Gandy on October 20 and 21, Neal confessed that he and another black man named Herbert Smith had raped and murdered Lola Cannady. He had no defense counsel. He later made another confession and said that he had acted alone.

== Lynching of Claude Neal ==
On October 26, an estimated 100 white people arrived in Brewton in about 30 cars. While one group distracted Sheriff G.S. Byrne of Escambia County, others went to the jail, searching the cells and taking Neal. This abduction of Neal was well planned and carried out. The group took Neal back to Marianna and Jackson County. They reassured each other about their actions, saying that Neal did not deserve a trial because of the heinous nature of his crimes.

The group told the newspapers that they intended to lynch Neal; they believed their decision was justified. This report was published by the Dothan Eagle and announced on the Dothan, Alabama radio station. The Associated Press sent a reporter to Marianna, and a reporter from the International News Service also covered the story. The governor of Florida was apprised, but said local officials had to request his aid in order for him to send in the National Guard, and they had not. The abductors announced that Neal would be lynched that night between the hours of 8 o'clock P.M. and 9 o'clock P.M. at the Cannady farm. A large group gathered at the farm formed to witness the Neal lynching; estimates of the crowd's size ranged from hundreds to several thousand.

The leaders in the group of spectators attempted to calm the group so that Neal could be brought to the property for the lynching, but became apprehensive as the group became impatient and unruly. The leaders, who had promised the Cannady family that they could be the first to attack Neal, tried to move the family away from the crowd to the site where Lola's body was found, in order to allow her father, George Cannady, to kill Neal.

When they learned that the Cannady family was on the move, the crowd quickly caught up, but when Neal was still not shown, the group grew increasingly restive. The committee of six in charge of Neal's lynching were worried that a riot could break out if Neal was brought in front of the crowd, and decided they would have to kill him in private. The men holding Neal took him to a spot in the woods near Peri Landing along the Chattahoochee River for the murder.

Claude Neal was tortured and subjected to castration, his genitalia were stuffed in his mouth, he was stabbed, burned with hot irons, and he was raised and lowered in hanging before he finally died. The men then tied his corpse to an automobile and drove to the Cannady property about 1 A.M. After the body was delivered, George Cannady, upset at being deprived of vengeance, shot Neal three times in the forehead. The crowd kicked the body, stabbed it, and ran over it with cars. Some people cut off toes or fingers for souvenirs. Children were encouraged to stab the body with sharpened sticks. The crowd turned outward, burning shacks in the area known to be owned by black people.

== Marianna riots ==
The body of Claude Neal was hanged from a tree outside of the county courthouse at 3 o'clock A.M. Photographers took souvenir photos of the body. When Sheriff Chambliss discovered Neal's body at 6 A.M., he cut it down and buried the man. A mob formed outside the courthouse, with over two thousand people having arrived by noon, but they were too late to see Neal's body. Some purchased picture postcards of the corpse from photographers for fifty cents each. The mob demanded that the sheriff hang Neal's body again outside the courthouse, but he refused.

In response to the sheriff's decision, the crowd started to riot. They attacked black people that day, October 27, 1934, injuring about 200 innocent black people making their way on the street. The mob also attacked and injured two white police officers, who were among those trying to suppress the disorder. Some white people took great risks by protecting black people during the riots, often aiding people with whom they worked. The mob headed into black areas of town, looting and burning houses. Florida Governor David Sholtz called in 129 troops of the Florida National Guard, which managed to suppress the riots.

== Effects ==
The brutal lynching of Claude Neal generated outrage throughout the country. According to historian James R. McGovern, this reaction contributed to mass lynchings losing some of their previous social acceptance. There is not a consensus on this conclusion. At the same time, Jessie Daniel Ames was organizing Southern white women to oppose lynchings, and had obtained 40,000 signatures toward this goal. Neal's lynching was covered by the national press and provoked strong opposition across the nation.

This lynching demonstrated the ineffectiveness of state and federal policies against the practice, which were especially limited in the South. While some Americans sought to establish lynching as a federal crime, the Solid South block in Congress, which derived its power from having disenfranchised most black people across the South since the turn of the century, consistently defeated any federal anti-lynching legislation.

== See also ==
- List of lynching victims in the United States
- The National Memorial for Peace and Justice
- False accusations of rape as justification for lynchings
