= Norman Thomas =

American Presbyterian minister and socialist politician (1884–1968)

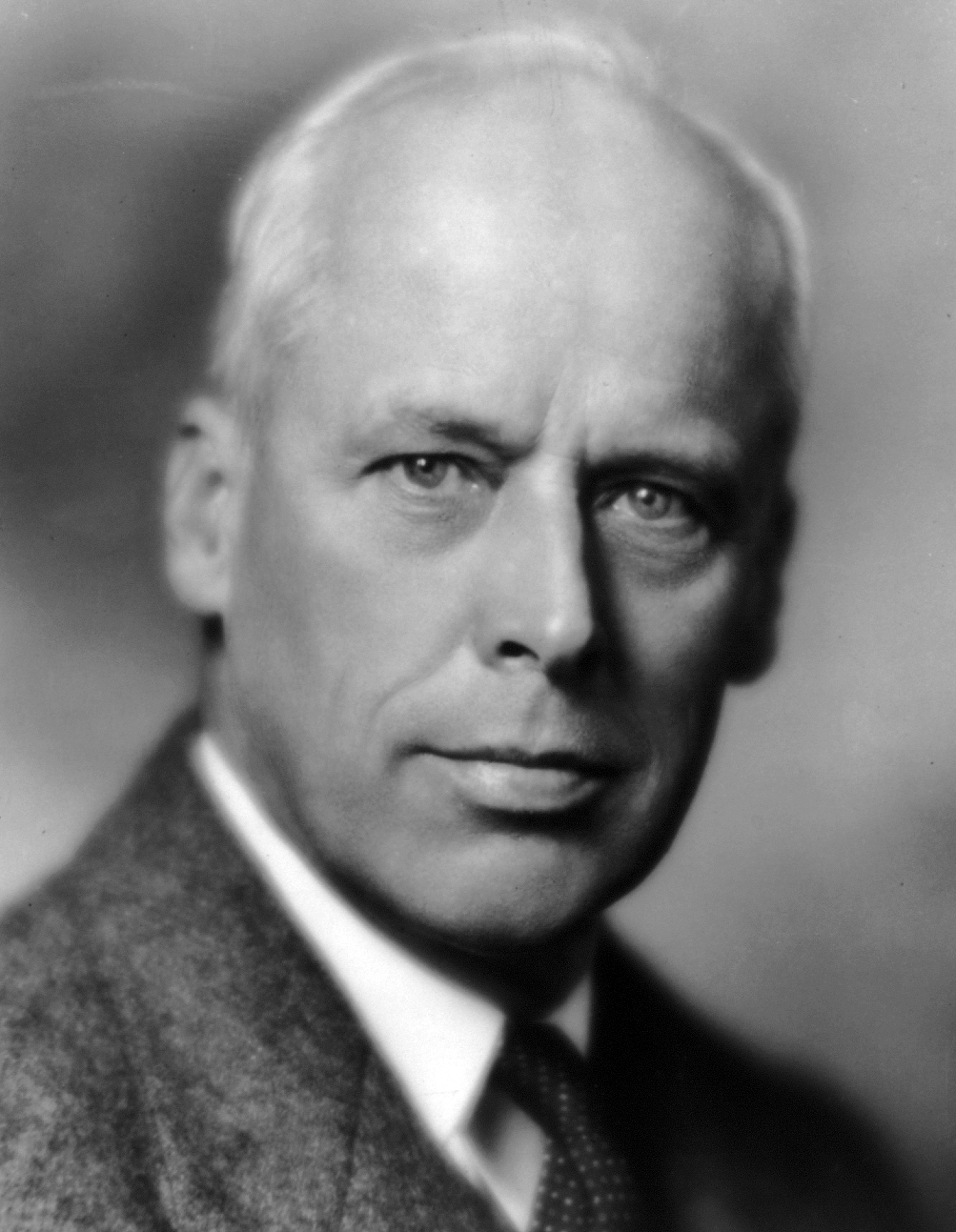
- Thomas in 1937

National Chairman of the Socialist Party of America
- In office July 16, 1936 – June 1, 1942
- Preceded by: Leo Krzycki
- Succeeded by: Maynard C. Krueger

Personal details
- Born: Norman Mattoon Thomas; November 20, 1884 Marion, Ohio, U.S.
- Died: December 19, 1968 (aged 84) Huntington, New York, U.S.
- Party: Socialist
- Spouse: Frances Stewart (m. 1910; died 1947)
- Children: 5
- Relatives: Evan Thomas (grandson); Louisa Thomas (great-granddaughter)
- Education: Bucknell University; Princeton University; Union Theological Seminary

Norman Mattoon Thomas (November 20, 1884 – December 19, 1968) was an American Presbyterian minister, political activist, and perennial candidate for president. He achieved fame as a socialist and pacifist, and was the Socialist Party of America's candidate for president in six consecutive elections between 1928 and 1948.

== Early years ==
Thomas was the oldest of six children, born November 20, 1884, in Marion, Ohio, to Emma Williams (née Mattoon) and Weddington Evans Thomas, a Presbyterian minister. Thomas had an uneventful Midwestern childhood and adolescence, helping to put himself through Marion High School as a paper carrier for Warren G. Harding's Marion Daily Star. Like other paper carriers, he reported directly to Florence Kling Harding. "No pennies ever escaped her," said Thomas. The summer after he graduated from high school his father accepted a pastorate at Lewisburg, Pennsylvania, which allowed Norman to attend Bucknell University. He left Bucknell after one year to attend Princeton University, the beneficiary of the largesse of a wealthy uncle by marriage. Thomas graduated magna cum laude from Princeton in 1905.

After some settlement house work and a trip around the world, Thomas decided to follow in his father's footsteps and enrolled in Union Theological Seminary. He graduated and was ordained as a Presbyterian minister in 1911. After assisting the Rev. Henry van Dyke at the fashionable Brick Presbyterian Church on Manhattan's Fifth Avenue, Thomas was appointed pastor of the East Harlem Presbyterian Church, ministering to Italian-American Protestants. Union Theological Seminary had been at that time a center of the Social Gospel movement and liberal politics, and as a minister, Thomas preached against American participation in the First World War. This pacifist stance led to his being shunned by many of his fellow alumni from Princeton, and opposed by some of the leadership of the Presbyterian Church in New York. When church funding of the American Parish's social programs was stopped, Thomas resigned his pastorate. Despite his resignation, Thomas did not formally leave the ministry until 1931, after his mother's death.

It was Thomas's position as a conscientious objector that drew him to the Socialist Party of America, a staunchly antimilitarist organization. When party leader Morris Hillquit campaigned in the 1917 New York City mayoral election on an antiwar platform, Thomas wrote to him expressing his good wishes. To his surprise, Hillquit wrote back, encouraging the young minister to work for his campaign, which Thomas energetically did. Soon thereafter he himself joined the Socialist Party. Thomas was a Christian socialist.

Thomas was the secretary (then an unpaid position) of the pacifist Fellowship of Reconciliation even before the war. When the organization started a magazine called The World Tomorrow in January 1918, Thomas was employed as its paid editor. Together with Devere Allen, Thomas helped to make The World Tomorrow the leading voice of liberal Christian social activism of its day. In 1921, Thomas moved to secular journalism when he was employed as associate editor of The Nation magazine. In 1922 he became co-director of the League for Industrial Democracy. Later, he was one of the founders of the National Civil Liberties Bureau, the precursor of the American Civil Liberties Union.

== Electoral politics ==
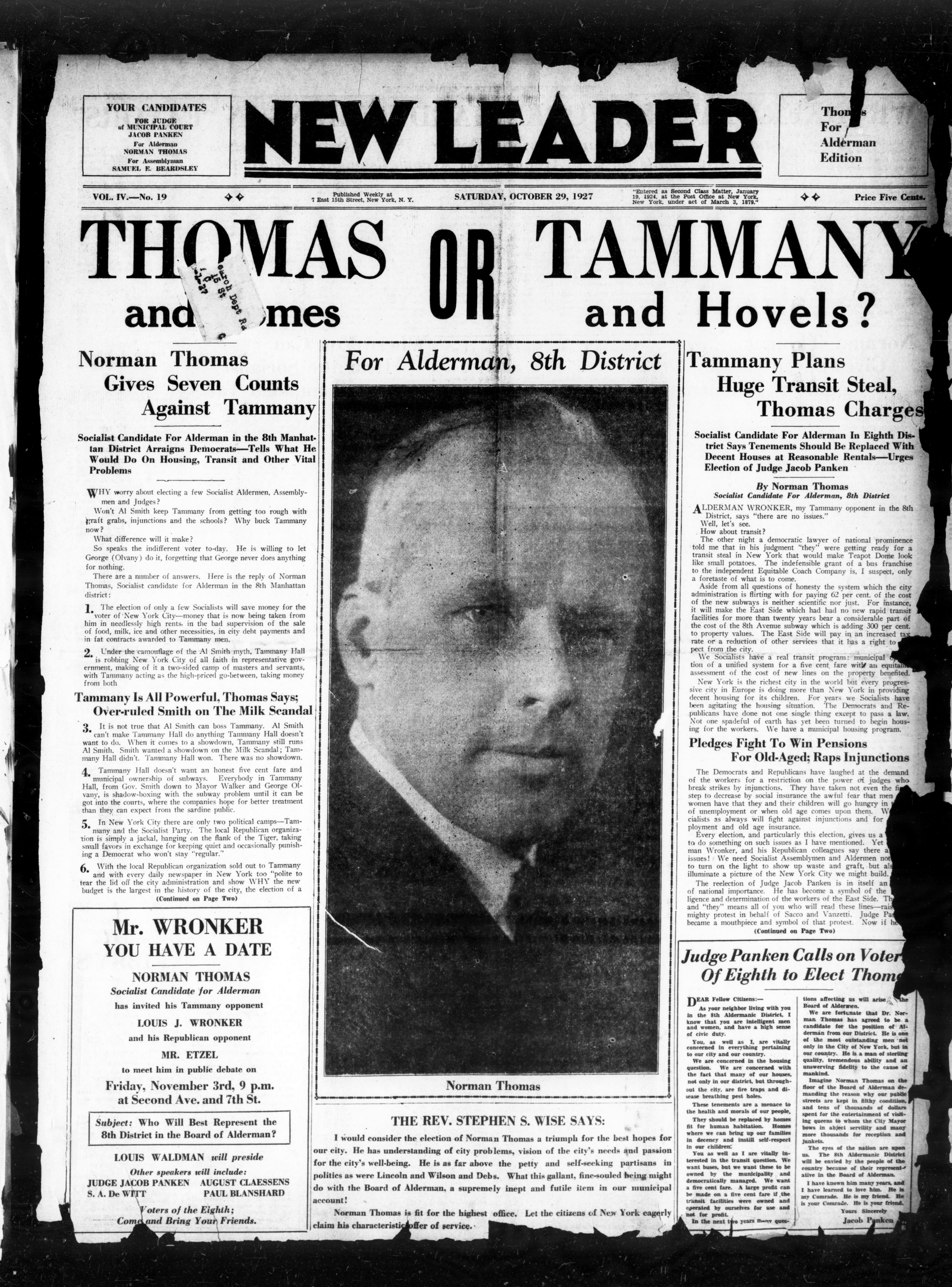
Front page of The New Leader featuring Thomas as an Aldermanic candidate, October 19, 1927

Thomas ran for office five times in quick succession on the Socialist ticket—for governor of New York in 1924, for mayor of New York in 1925, for New York State Senate in 1926, for alderman in 1927, and for mayor of New York again in 1929. In 1934, he ran for the US Senate in New York and polled almost 200,000 votes, then the second-best result for a Socialist candidate in New York state elections; only Charles P. Steinmetz polled more votes, almost 300,000 in 1922 when he ran for State Engineer.

Thomas's political activity also included attempts at the US presidency. Following Eugene Debs's death in 1926, there was a leadership vacuum in the Socialist Party. Neither of the party's two top political leaders, Victor L. Berger and Hillquit, was eligible to run for president because of their foreign birth. The third main figure, Daniel Hoan, was occupied as mayor of Milwaukee, Wisconsin. Down to approximately 8,000 dues-paying members, the Socialist Party's options were limited, and the little-known minister from New York with oratorial skills and a pedigree in the movement became the choice of the 1928 National Convention of the Socialist Party.

The 1928 campaign was the first of Thomas's six consecutive campaigns as the presidential nominee of the Socialist Party. As an articulate and engaging spokesman for democratic socialism, Thomas had considerably greater influence than the typical perennial candidate, but never achieved Debs's level of popularity, topping out at 2.23% of the vote in the realignment election of 1932.

Thomas frequently spoke on the difference between socialism, the movement he represented, and communism and revolutionary Marxism. His early admiration for the Russian Revolution had turned into energetic anti-Stalinism. His moderate socialism drew criticism from the left. Leon Trotsky questioned his commitment to socialism, calling Thomas "a bourgeois with a socialist 'ideal'" whose "personal life, interests, ties, moral criteria exist outside the party" and criticized his expulsion of "Trotskyists" from the SPA.

Thomas wrote several books, among them his passionate defense of World War I conscientious objectors, Is Conscience a Crime?, and his statement of the 1960s social democratic consensus, Socialism Re-examined.

== Socialist Party politics ==
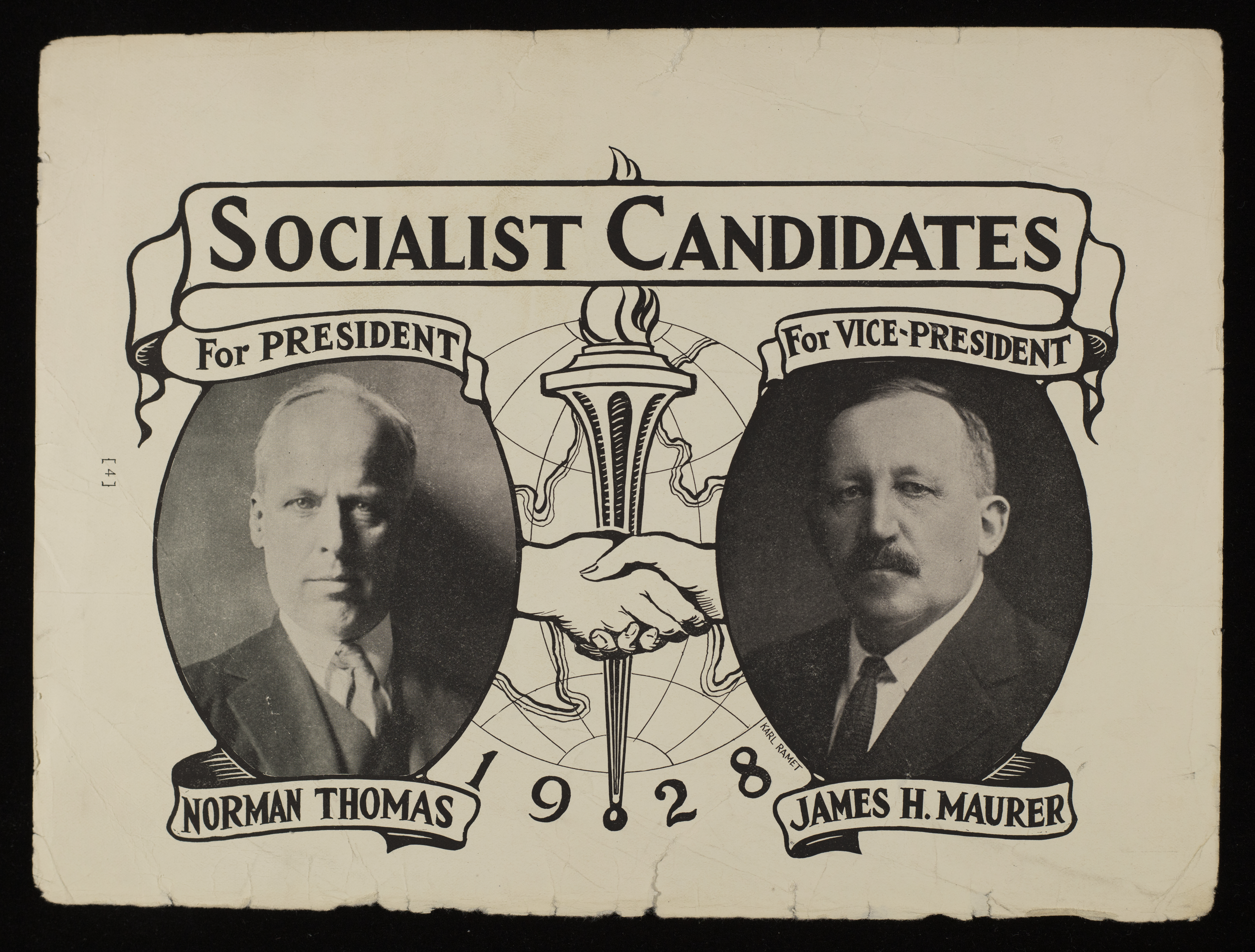
Norman Thomas and James H. Maurer as candidates for president and vice president, 1928

Thomas favored work to establish a broad Farmer–Labor Party modeled on the Canadian Cooperative Commonwealth Federation, but remained supportive of the Militants and their vision of an "all-inclusive party", which welcomed members of dissident communist organizations (including Lovestoneites and Trotskyists) and worked with the Communist Party USA in joint Popular Front activities. The party descended into a maelstrom of factionalism in the interval, with the New York Old Guard leaving to establish themselves as the Social Democratic Federation of America, taking with them control of party property, such as the Yiddish-language The Jewish Daily Forward, the English-language New Leader, the Rand School of Social Science, and the party's summer camp in Pennsylvania.

In April 1938, Thomas was the center of national controversy when he came to Jersey City, New Jersey to defend labor organizers' free speech and challenge the political machine of Mayor Frank Hague. Hague was a close ally of Franklin D. Roosevelt and controlled federal patronage in the state. Though denied a permit, Thomas came anyway to speak at an outdoor rally. The police arrested him as soon as he got out of his car. As the officers prepared to expel him from the city, Thomas quipped, "So this is Jersey justice". People across the political spectrum, including the 1932 and 1936 Republican presidential nominees, Herbert Hoover and Alfred M. Landon, criticized Hague for his suppression of free speech and Roosevelt for his silence about the incident. Thomas and Landon became good friends as a result of the incident.

== Causes ==
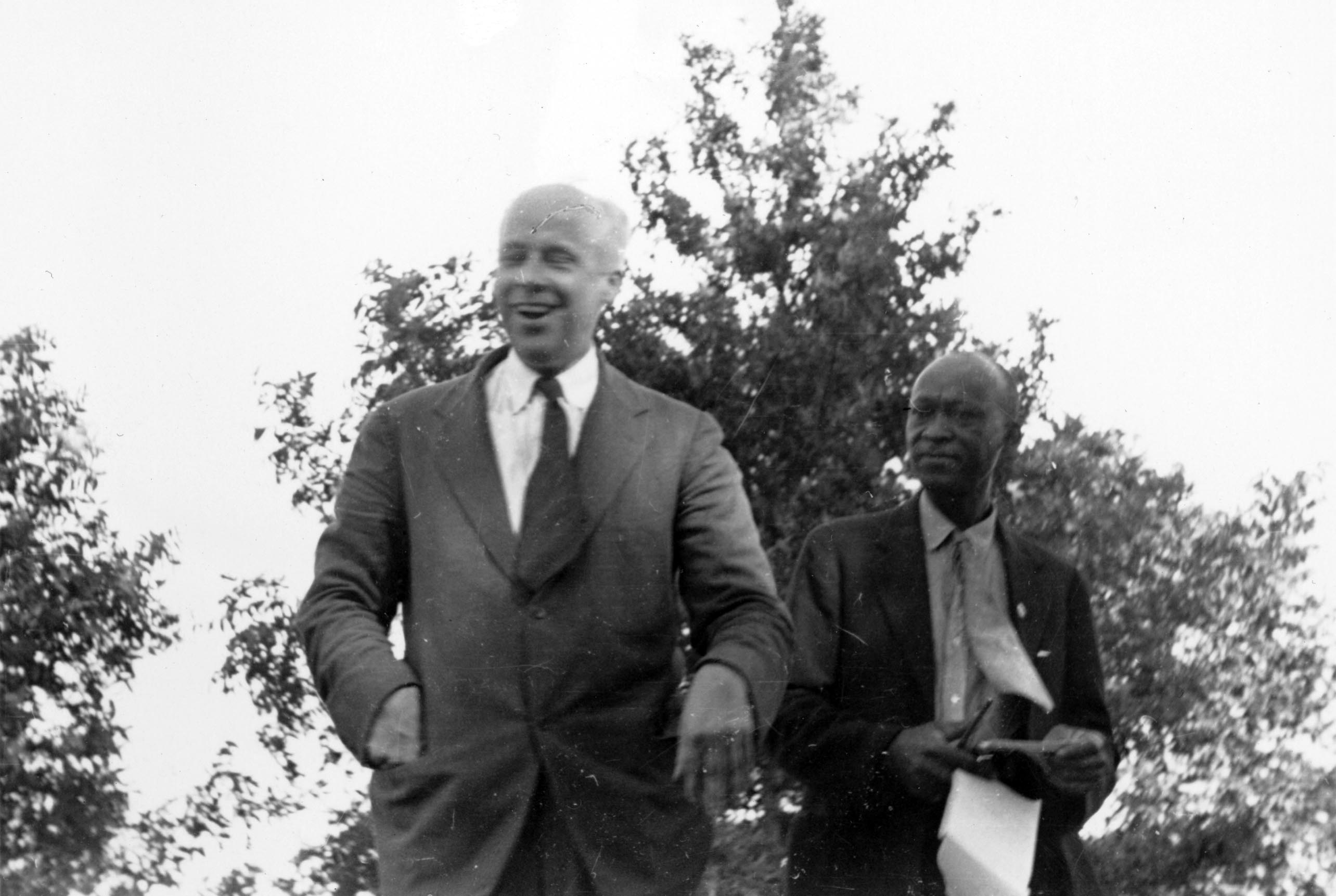
Thomas speaking at a STFU meeting in 1937 (by Louise Boyle)

Thomas was initially as outspoken in opposing the Second World War as he had been with regard to the First World War. Upon returning from a European tour in 1937, he formed the Keep America Out of War Congress, and spoke against war, thereby sharing a platform with the non-interventionist America First Committee. In the 1940 presidential campaign he said Republican Wendell Willkie was the candidate of "the Wall Street war machine" and that he "would take us to war about as fast and about on the same terms as Mr. Roosevelt".

In testimony to Congress in January 1941 he opposed the proposed Lend Lease program of sending military supplies to the United Kingdom, calling it "a bill to authorize undeclared war in the name of peace, and dictatorship in the name of defending democracy". He said that the survival of the British Empire was not vital to the security of the United States, but added that he favored helping Britain to defend herself against aggression.

After the Japanese attack on Pearl Harbor on December 7, 1941, a bitter split took place in the Socialist Party regarding support for the war; Thomas reluctantly supported it, though he thought it could have been honorably avoided. His brother and many others continued their pacifist opposition to all wars. Thomas later wrote self-critically that he had "overemphasized both the sense in which it was a continuance of World War I and the capacity of nonfascist Europe to resist the Nazis".

Thomas was one of the few public figures to oppose President Roosevelt's incarceration of Japanese Americans following the attack on Pearl Harbor. He accused the ACLU of "dereliction of duty" when the organization supported the forced mass removal and incarceration. Thomas also campaigned against racial segregation, environmental depletion, and anti-labor laws and practices, and in favor of opening the United States to Jewish victims of Nazi persecution in the 1930s.

Thomas was an early proponent of birth control. The birth-control advocate Margaret Sanger recruited him to write "Some Objections to Birth Control Considered" in Religious and Ethical Aspects of Birth Control, edited and published by Sanger in 1926. Thomas accused the Catholic Church of hypocritical opinions on sex, such as requiring priests to be celibate and maintaining that laypeople should have sex only to reproduce. "This doctrine of unrestricted procreation is strangely inconsistent on the lips of men who practice celibacy and preach continence."

Thomas also deplored the secular objection to birth control because it originated from "racial and national" group-think. "The white race, we are told, our own nation—whatever that nation may be—is endangered by practicing birth control. Birth control is something like disarmament—a good thing if effected by international agreement, but otherwise dangerous to us in both a military and economic sense. If we are not to be overwhelmed by the 'rising tide of color' we must breed against the world. If our nation is to survive, it must have more cannon and more babies as prospective food for the cannon."

== Later years ==
After 1945, Thomas sought to make the anti-Stalinist left the leader of social reform, in collaboration with labor leaders like Walter Reuther. In 1961, he released an album, The Minority Party in America: Featuring an Interview with Norman Thomas, on Folkways Records, which focused on the role of the third party.

Thomas actively campaigned for Lyndon B. Johnson in the 1964 presidential election. He was critical of Johnson's foreign policy, but praised his work on civil rights and poverty. Thomas called Johnson's opponent Barry Goldwater a "personable man with good stands on domestic issues" but also described him as "the greatest evil" due to his views on foreign policy.

Thomas's 80th birthday in 1964 was marked by a well-publicized gala at the Hotel Astor in Manhattan. At the event Thomas called for a cease-fire in the Vietnam War and read birthday telegrams from Hubert Humphrey, Earl Warren, and Martin Luther King Jr. He also received a check for $17,500 (equivalent to $181,700 in 2025) in donations from supporters. "It won't last long," he said of the check, "because every organization I'm connected with is going bankrupt."

In 1966, the conservative journalist and writer William F. Buckley, Jr chose Thomas to be the third guest on Buckley's new television interview show, Firing Line. In 1968, Thomas signed the "Writers and Editors War Tax Protest" pledge, vowing to refuse tax payments in protest against the Vietnam War.

Also in 1966, Thomas traveled to the Dominican Republic along with future Congressman Allard K. Lowenstein to observe that country's general election. The two were leaders of the "Committee on free elections in the Dominican Republic", an organization based in the U.S. that monitored the election, in which Juan Bosch of the Dominican Revolutionary Party, affiliated with the Socialist International, was beaten closely but decisively by the conservative ex-president Joaquín Balaguer. Balaguer continued to govern the country on and off for the next 30 years. In the autumn of that year, Thomas received the second Eugene V. Debs Award for his work in promoting world peace.

== Personal life ==
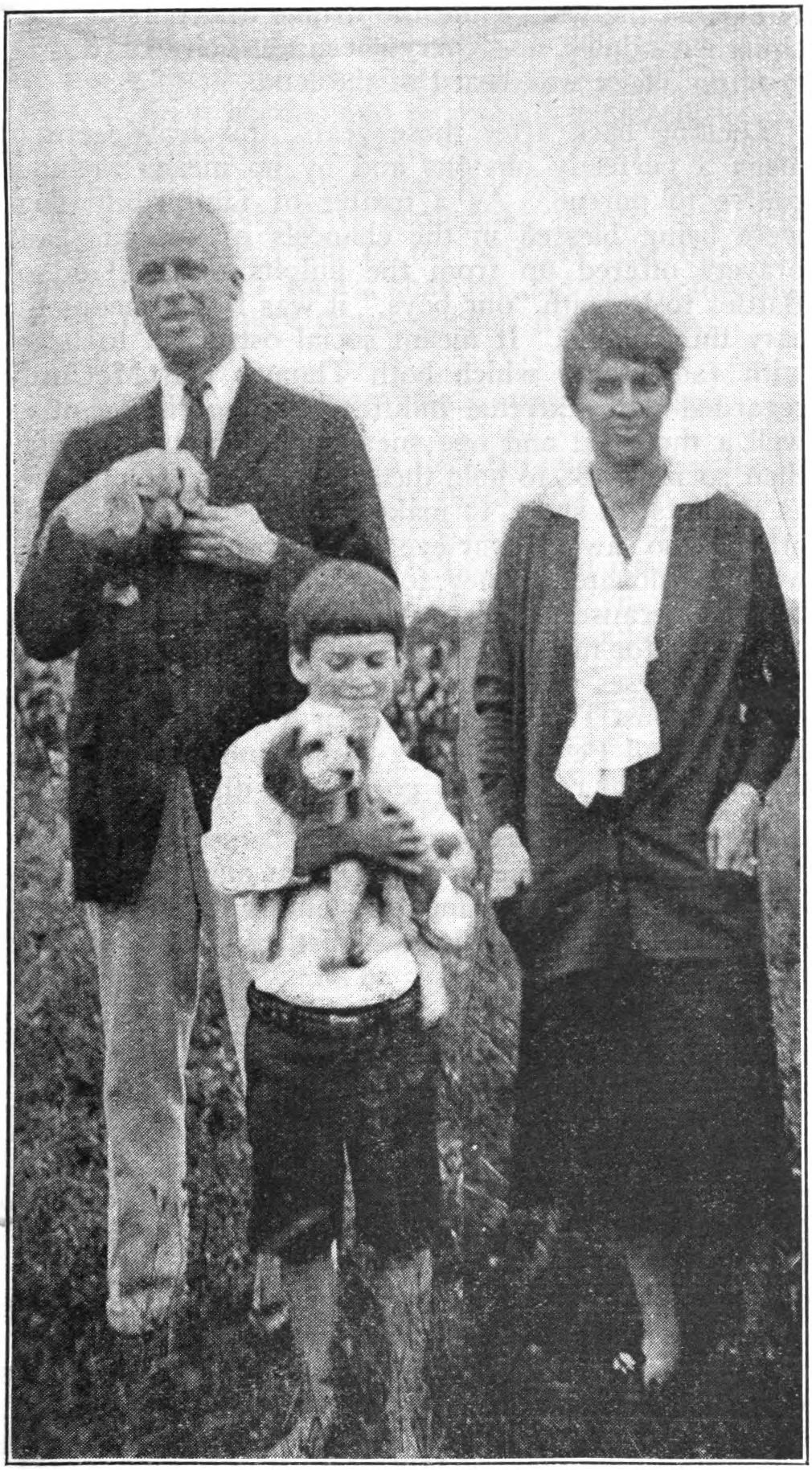
Thomas with his wife Violet and youngest son Evan c. 1928

In 1910, Thomas married Frances Violet Stewart (1881–1947), the granddaughter of John Aikman Stewart, financial adviser to Presidents Lincoln and Cleveland, and a trustee of Princeton for many years. Together, they had three daughters and two sons:

- Mary "Polly" Thomas (1914–2010), who married Herbert C. Miller Jr, a professor and chairman of pediatrics at the University of Kansas
- Frances Thomas (1915–2015), who married John W. Gates, Jr. (died 2006)
- Rebekah Thomas (1918–1986), who married John D. Friebely
- William Stewart Thomas (1912–1988)
- Evan Welling Thomas II (1920–1999), who married Anna Davis (née Robins) in 1943
  - Evan Welling Thomas III (b. 1951)

=== Death ===
Thomas died at the age of 84 on December 19, 1968, at a nursing home in Huntington, New York. Pursuant to his wishes, he was cremated and his ashes were scattered on Long Island.

=== Legacy ===
The Norman Thomas High School (formerly known as Central Commercial High School) in Manhattan and the Norman Thomas '05 Library at Princeton University's Forbes College are named after him, as is the assembly hall at the Three Arrows Cooperative Society, where he was a frequent visitor. He is also the grandfather of Newsweek columnist Evan Thomas and the great-grandfather of writer Louisa Thomas.

Party political offices
Preceded by Robert M. La Follette; Endorsed	Socialist nominee for President of the United States; 1928, 1932, 1936, 1940, 1944, 1948	Succeeded by Darlington Hoopes
