= Jonestown, Coahoma County, Mississippi =

Jonestown, Mississippi
- Town
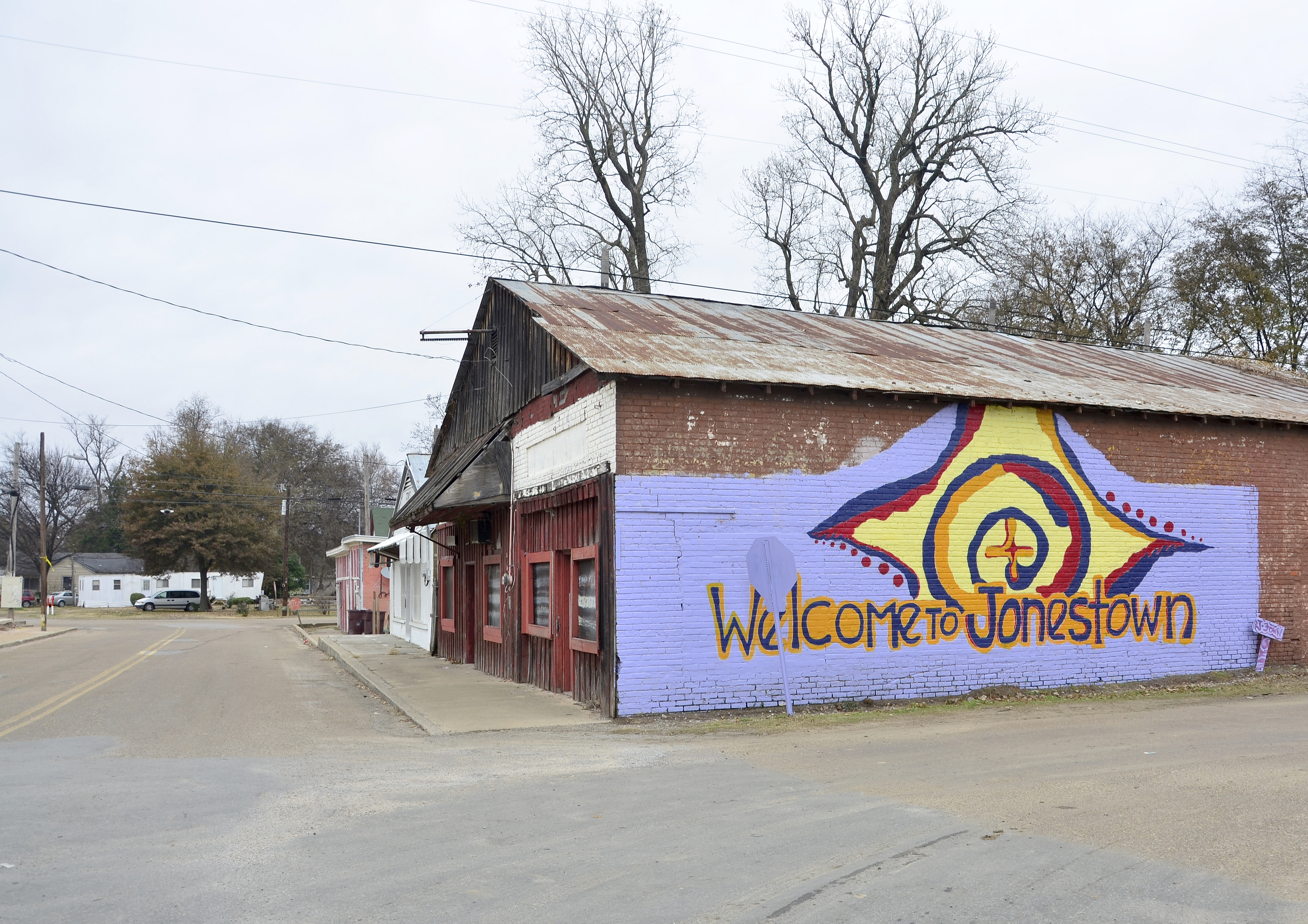
- Church Street in Jonestown

- Flag

- Location of Jonestown in Coahoma County, Mississippi

- Location in the United States
- Coordinates: 34°19′20″N 90°27′15″W
- Country: United States
- State: Mississippi
- County: Coahoma

Area
  - Total: 0.39 sq mi (1.00 km^{2})
  - Land: 0.39 sq mi (1.00 km^{2})
  - Water: 0 sq mi (0.00 km^{2})
- Elevation: 171 ft (52 m)

Population (2020)
  - Total: 962
  - Density: 2,483.3/sq mi (958.79/km^{2})
- Time zone: UTC-6 (Central (CST))
  - Summer (DST): UTC-5 (CDT)
- ZIP code: 38639
- Area code: 662
- FIPS code: 28-36800
- GNIS feature ID: 2405920

Jonestown is a town in Coahoma County, Mississippi, United States. Per the 2020 census, the population was 962.

== History ==
The Matagorda Plantation, located north of Jonestown, was established by Colonel D.M. Russell and his wife before the Civil War. Matagorda was named after a special variety of long-staple cotton raised there.

Jonestown was a stop on the Mobile & North Western Railroad, completed from Jonestown to Lula in 1879. Jonestown was incorporated in 1880.

In 1965, John Wing was elected mayor of Jonestown, the first Chinese-American mayor in Mississippi.

== Geography ==
Jonestown is located in northeastern Coahoma County. It is 2.5 miles (4.0 km) east of U.S. Routes 49 and 61 and 13 miles (21 km) northeast of Clarksdale, the county seat.

According to the United States Census Bureau, the town has a total area of 0.39 square miles (1.0 km^{2}), all land.

== Demographics ==
Historical population
Census	Pop.	Note	%±
1880	147		—
1890	286		94.6%
1900	317		10.8%
1910	367		15.8%
1920	469		27.8%
1930	506		7.9%
1940	706		39.5%
1950	741		5.0%
1960	889		20.0%
1970	1,110		24.9%
1980	1,231		10.9%
1990	1,467		19.2%
2000	1,701		16.0%
2010	1,298		−23.7%
2020	962		−25.9%
U.S. Decennial Census; 2010 2020

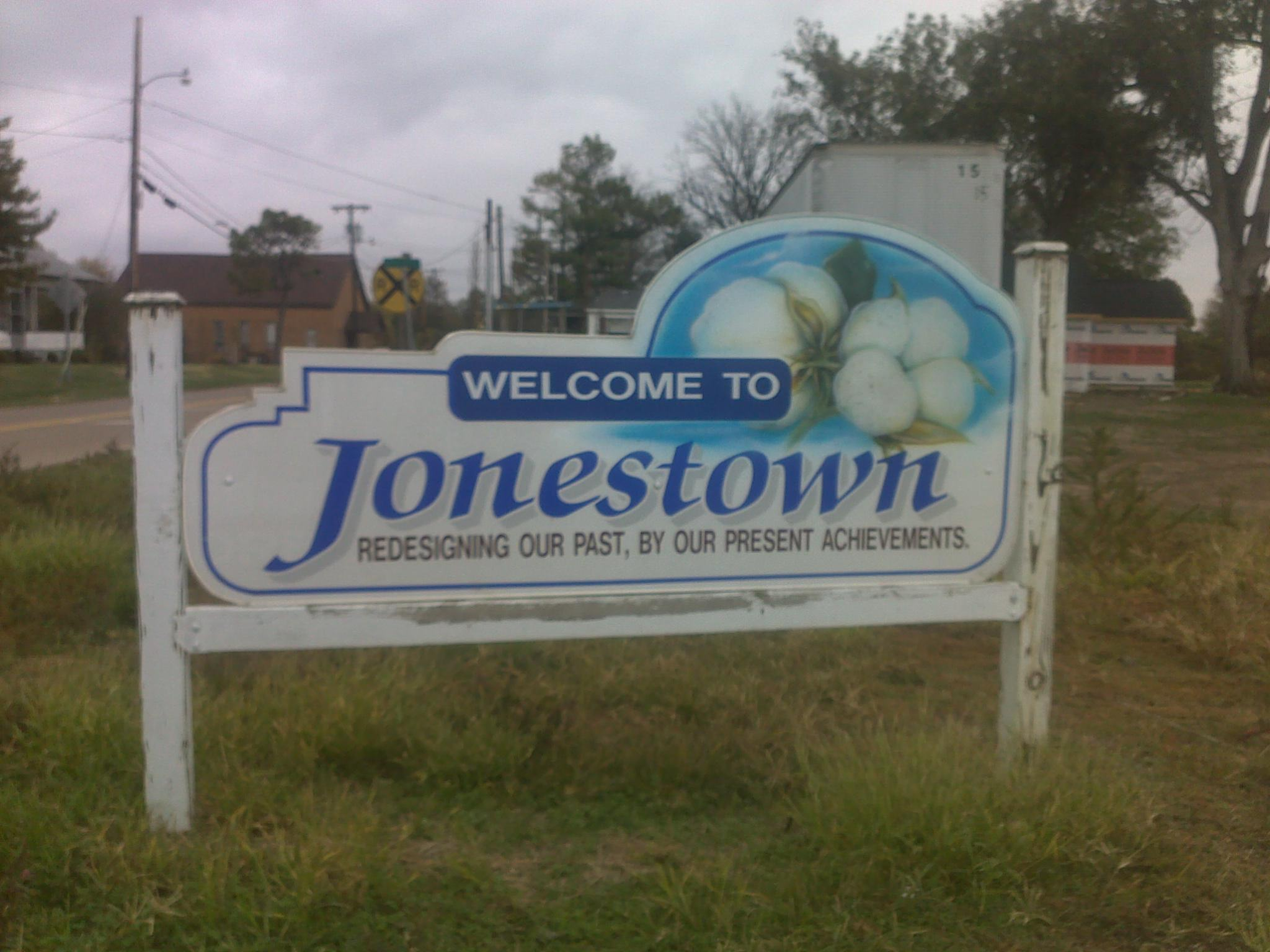
Jonestown sign

=== Racial and ethnic composition ===
Jonestown town, Mississippi – Racial and ethnic composition Note: the US Census treats Hispanic/Latino as an ethnic category. This table excludes Latinos from the racial categories and assigns them to a separate category. Hispanics/Latinos may be of any race.
Race / Ethnicity (NH = Non-Hispanic)	Pop 2000	Pop 2010	Pop 2020	% 2000	% 2010	% 2020
White alone (NH)	42	22	5	2.47%	1.69%	0.52%
Black or African American alone (NH)	1,637	1,268	944	96.24%	97.69%	98.13%
Native American or Alaska Native alone (NH)	0	1	1	0.00%	0.08%	0.10%
Asian alone (NH)	1	0	1	0.06%	0.00%	0.10%
Native Hawaiian or Pacific Islander alone (NH)	0	0	0	0.00%	0.00%	0.00%
Other race alone (NH)	0	0	0	0.00%	0.00%	0.00%
Mixed race or Multiracial (NH)	13	3	4	0.76%	0.23%	0.42%
Hispanic or Latino (any race)	8	4	7	0.47%	0.31%	0.73%
Total	1,701	1,298	962	100.00%	100.00%	100.00%

=== 2000 Census ===
As of the census of 2000, there were 1,701 people, 491 households, and 364 families residing in the town. The population density was 4,315.1 inhabitants per square mile (1,666.1/km^{2}). There were 514 housing units at an average density of 1,303.9 units per square mile (503.4 units/km^{2}). The racial makeup of the town was 96.30% African American, 2.59% White, 0.06% Asian, 0.06% Pacific Islander, 0.24% from other races, and 0.76% from two or more races. Hispanic or Latino of any race were 0.47% of the population.

There were 491 households, of which 47.7% had children under the age of 18 living with them, 21.2% were married couples living together, 47.9% had a female householder with no husband present, and 25.7% were non-families. 21.4% of all households were made up of individuals, and 11.0% had someone living alone who was 65 years of age or older. The average household size was 3.46 and the average family size was 4.05.

In the town, the population was spread out, with 44.4% under the age of 18, 11.1% from 18 to 24, 25.0% from 25 to 44, 11.5% from 45 to 64, and 7.9% who were 65 years of age or older. The median age was 21 years. For every 100 females, there were 82.1 males. For every 100 females age 18 and over, there were 65.8 males.

The median income for a household in the town was $17,250 (in 1999 dollars), and the median income for a family was $18,958. Males had a median income of $16,146 versus $19,125 for females. The per capita income for the town was $8,258. About 49.6% of families and 52.1% of the population were below the poverty line, including 57.7% of those under age 18 and 56.3% of those age 65 or over.

== Economy ==
Delta Oil Mill has been producing cottonseed products in Jonestown since 1942.

In a 2000 study published by Mississippi State University, Jonestown was described as a community "plagued by difficult problems." Agriculture no longer supported the town as it once had, and many Jonestown residents were employed outside the community. "The direction of Jonestown has declined because of the loss of its financial independence. Citizens have been forced to seek opportunity outside of their own town. As people become more dependent on other cities, the need to stay in Jonestown diminishes."

Pulitzer Prize-winning poet Charles Simic wrote in 2006:

There are towns like Jonestown, Mississippi, that in their shocking poverty make one gasp. Weathered, sagging and unpainted houses, boarded-up windows, others covered with plastic, yards full of dismantled rusty cars, their parts scattered about amid all kinds of other junk and trash, are everywhere. Idle people of all ages lounge on collapsing porches or stand on street corners waiting for something to do. In the countryside with its fertile dark soil, soybeans have become the chief crop, poultry farms are a major business, and there are nine gambling casinos in the next county. All that has increased per capita income in the region, but there was no evidence of it among the blacks I saw.

== Education ==
Jonestown is served by the Coahoma County School District. Residents are served by Jonestown Elementary School and Coahoma County Junior-Senior High School.

== Infrastructure ==
Durocher Service Program is a well-regarded benevolent organization providing social services to Jonestown residents. It is operated by the Sisters of the Holy Names of Jesus and Mary. Catholic Cardinal Avery Dulles described the work of the ministry in Jonestown as "bringing hope to people on the verge of desperation." In 2012, one of the program's nuns survived being beaten and stabbed during a robbery at her Jonestown home.

== Notable people ==
- Luke Easter, one of the first African-Americans in major-league baseball; first baseman for the Cleveland Indians
- Oscar Reed, professional football player
- Owen Whitfield, preacher and union organizer
- Seelig Wise (1913–2004), farmer in Jonestown and the first Republican member of the Mississippi State Senate since Reconstruction
