= Owen Whitfield =

American preacher (1891-1965)

Owen Whitfield (October 14, 1891 - August 1965) was a preacher and leader of the 1939 Missouri Sharecropper Roadside Demonstration, where both black and white homeless sharecropping families camped out on the side of the road as a means of getting the government's attention on the vast poverty and injustice of tenants. He was also a union organizer for the Southern Tenant Farmers Union which was “dedicated to the complete abolition of tenantry and wage slavery in all its forms”. Through his use of applied religion, Whitfield mobilized his audiences and exhorted them to stop thinking of the afterlife and instead focus on living and practicing their faith. He is noted for preaching to his audiences: “take your eyes out of the sky because someone is stealing your bread”.

== Personal life ==
Owen Whitfield was born in 1892 in Jonestown, Mississippi to a sharecropping family. His parents were sharecroppers, so they moved often in order to find independence, better wages, and security. After the family purchased some land, his mother died and Whitfield moved in with his uncle in 1909. His uncle, Chuck Whitfield, who was also a sharecropper, funded Owen's education at Okolona Industrial School. This school was a black institute dedicated to teaching and improving the lives of African Americans. Unlike the Tuskegee Institute in Alabama, which specialized in agricultural and manual labor education, Okolona also taught grammar, nursing, chemistry, music, and English literature. After two years at the school, he met and married Zella Glass, who was then a thirteen-year-old cotton picker and daughter of a sharecropper. By 1941, Owen and his wife bore a total of fifteen children. He gained publicity for his participation in the 1939 Sharecropper Roadside Demonstration. He died in 1965.

== Spiritual life ==
Owen Whitfield began preaching in 1924 in the Bootheel but his spirituality was affected by circumstances throughout his childhood. As a child, his mother, who was a devout Christian, would associate the discriminations of the white populations with the devil and would instill in him Christian values. In addition, the principles of the Okolona Industrial School, which emphasized the importance of civic service, also influenced his desire to preach. On November 5, 1936, after he had established himself as a preacher, Whitfield invited Claude Williams to preach at his church. Williams encouraged the congregation to unite and confront southern injustices to better their positions in society. Whitfield was so enthused about William's message that soon after he joined the Southern Tenant Farmers Union.

== Involvement with the Southern Tenant Farmers Union ==
Whitfield joined the Southern Tenant Farmers Union in 1937 after a spiritual encounter in the summer of 1936. During this summer day, his daughter ran to him and told him that the family had run out of food. Whitfield then fell to his knees in anger and prayed. Whitfield noted that the voice of the Lord came to him and explained that he was indeed blessed but that it was his fault for letting people, the planters, take away his bounty.

After he joined the union, Whitfield used his status as a preacher to reach his congregations. He used the pulpit to preach in favor of the STFU and also used the church as a safe house, for union activities, away from planters. His position as preacher gave him many connections and a respectable status in his community. He made ties with both blacks and whites, including Thad Snow who was a “radical” planter who often advocated for the rights of the tenants in the Bootheel. Under Snow's guidance and help, Whitfield and his family were able to obtain lodging at the La Forge Project, which was aimed at helping homeless tenants. In addition, in 1937, Whitfield was elected vice president of the STFU.

== The 1939 Sharecroppers Roadside Demonstration ==
Throughout his involvement in the STFU, Whitfield opposed strikes and urged the sharecroppers to use the power of the government to obtain victories. This belief was used as a backdrop for the 1939 Sharecropper Roadside Demonstration.

As part of President Franklin D. Roosevelt's New Deal agricultural program, the Agricultural Adjustment Act (AAA) was passed. This law was supposed to bring relief to farmers by increasing cotton prices. Although planting acreages were cut, the government issued checks to the farmers as compensation. The sharecroppers were not happy about this legislation however. They viewed it as an evil since the planters would keep the entire checks for themselves by explaining to their tenants that they were switching from employing sharecroppers to day laborers. As a result, the planters would evict the sharecroppers.

In January 1939, mass evictions of sharecroppers were to occur in the Bootheel. Because Whitfield preferred bringing change through the government, he organized the mass demonstration of evicted sharecroppers along the 60 and 61 U.S Highways in the Bootheel. But Whitfield did not plan to just leave the sharecroppers on the road; he wanted the event to be highly publicized. He invited reporters to the mass meetings before and during the demonstration. During the demonstration, Whitfield was not present because of death threats addressed to him. Instead, he was in the north advocating help from politicians. In February 1939, Whitfield met with President Roosevelt who agreed to help the sharecroppers. Previous to this, however, the state forced the demonstrators to leave the roadsides because they were hurting the public health. After some time, Whitfield was able to compromise the construction of Delmo Security Homes where more than six hundred sharecropping families were housed. By this time, Owen Whitfield, the preacher and union organizer had gained nationwide recognition as the man who “woke up the cotton slaves” in the Bootheel, Missouri during the first half of the twentieth century.
