= Luke Easter (baseball) =

American baseball player (1915–1979)

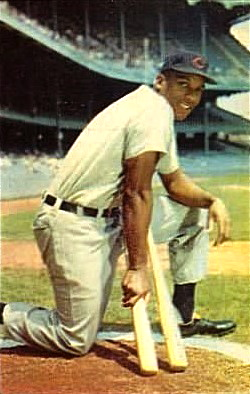
- Easter at Yankee Stadium, circa 1953
- First baseman
- Born: August 4, 1915; Jonestown, Mississippi, U.S.
- Died: March 29, 1979 (aged 63); Euclid, Ohio, U.S.
- Batted: Left Threw: Right

Professional debut
- NgL: 1947, for the Homestead Grays
- MLB: August 11, 1949, for the Cleveland Indians

Last MLB appearance
- May 4, 1954, for the Cleveland Indians

MLB statistics
- Batting average: .276
- Home runs: 104
- Runs batted in: 413
- Stats at Baseball Reference

Teams
- Homestead Grays (1947–1948); Cleveland Indians (1949–1954)

Career highlights and awards
- NgL All-Star (1948)

Luscious "Luke" Easter (August 4, 1915 (Note: The birth year listed here is drawn from census data. Easter himself listed multiple birth years ranging from 1911 to 1921 on different occasions, so some ambiguity as to the correct year exists.) – March 29, 1979) was an American professional baseball player in Major League Baseball and the Negro leagues. He batted left-handed, threw right-handed, was 6 ft 4 in (1.93 m), and weighed 240 lb.

== Early life ==
Luke Easter was born in Jonestown, Mississippi to parents James and Maude Easter. His father was a graduate of the Tuskegee Institute. His mother, Maude, died in 1922 and the family moved to St. Louis, Missouri where his father worked in a glass factory. Prior to that time, the Easters had been farmers in the Mississippi Delta. Luke Easter attended the same high school as fellow Negro league star, Quincy Trouppe, before dropping out in the ninth grade. For the next few years, Easter worked a variety of jobs such as shoeshiner, hat making, and for a dry cleaner.

Although Easter was good enough to be a professional player, there was no Negro league franchise in St. Louis. So, in 1937 Easter joined the top team in the area, a semipro outfit called the St. Louis Titanium Giants. The team was made up of African-Americans employed by the National Lead Company. Players would work their factory jobs during the week, often with time off to practice, then play baseball for the company on weekends. Easter earned $20 per week plus another ten to twenty on the weekends playing baseball. Luke Easter was a very large man, standing 6 feet 4 inches (1.93 m) in height and weighing around 240 pounds (110 kg). A left-handed hitting first baseman, he was known for towering home runs. During his five years with the Giants, they fielded a very competitive team. Also featuring Sam Jethroe, they went 6–0 in exhibitions against teams from the Negro American League in 1940.

With World War II raging and America soon to enter the fray, Luke Easter planned to enlist in the United States Army in 1941. However, while returning from a trip to Memphis, Tennessee with Sam Jethroe, Easter was involved in an auto accident that left him with a fractured leg. Luscious "Luke" Easter, serial number 37 368 805, was finally inducted into the Army at Jefferson Barracks in St. Louis on June 22, 1942. Assigned to the Quartermaster Corps after basic training, he was stationed at Fort Leonard Wood in Missouri, about 100 miles (160 km) southwest of St. Louis. Easter was separated from the Army at Fort Leonard Wood on July 3, 1943, and thereafter worked in the defense industry.

Following the war's end in 1945, Luke Easter had tryouts with two Negro National League teams, the Kansas City Monarchs and the Chicago American Giants. Both teams felt he was too big and awkward to be a good ballplayer despite his previous success with the Titanium Giants. Manager "Candy Jim" Taylor of the American Giants elected not to sign Easter, but referred him to promoter Abe Saperstein—famous for being the founder of the Harlem Globetrotters. At that time, Saperstein was founding a new touring baseball team, the Cincinnati Crescents. Saperstein signed Easter, and after a successful 1946 season, sold him to the Homestead Grays.

== Negro and Major Leagues ==
Easter was a solid contributor to the Grays in 1947, and excelled in 1948. That year, he batted .363, tied for the league lead in home runs, and led the league in runs batted in. He led the Grays to a victory over the Birmingham Black Barons in the 1948 Negro World Series. His success attracted the attention of Bill Veeck, owner of the Cleveland Indians, who purchased his contract from the Grays. A knee injury in spring training in 1949 cost Easter a spot on the major league roster at the start of the season. He started the year in the Pacific Coast League with the San Diego Padres despite a mid-season operation on the knee, and continued to be a star, prompting coach Jimmie Reese to remark, "Easter is the only player I ever saw who can hit a baseball as far as Babe Ruth." He again batted .363, along with 25 home runs and 80 RBIs. This performance impressed the Indians so much that they called Easter up for a brief appearance at the end of the season, and, early in 1950, traded All-Star Mickey Vernon to open up first base for him.

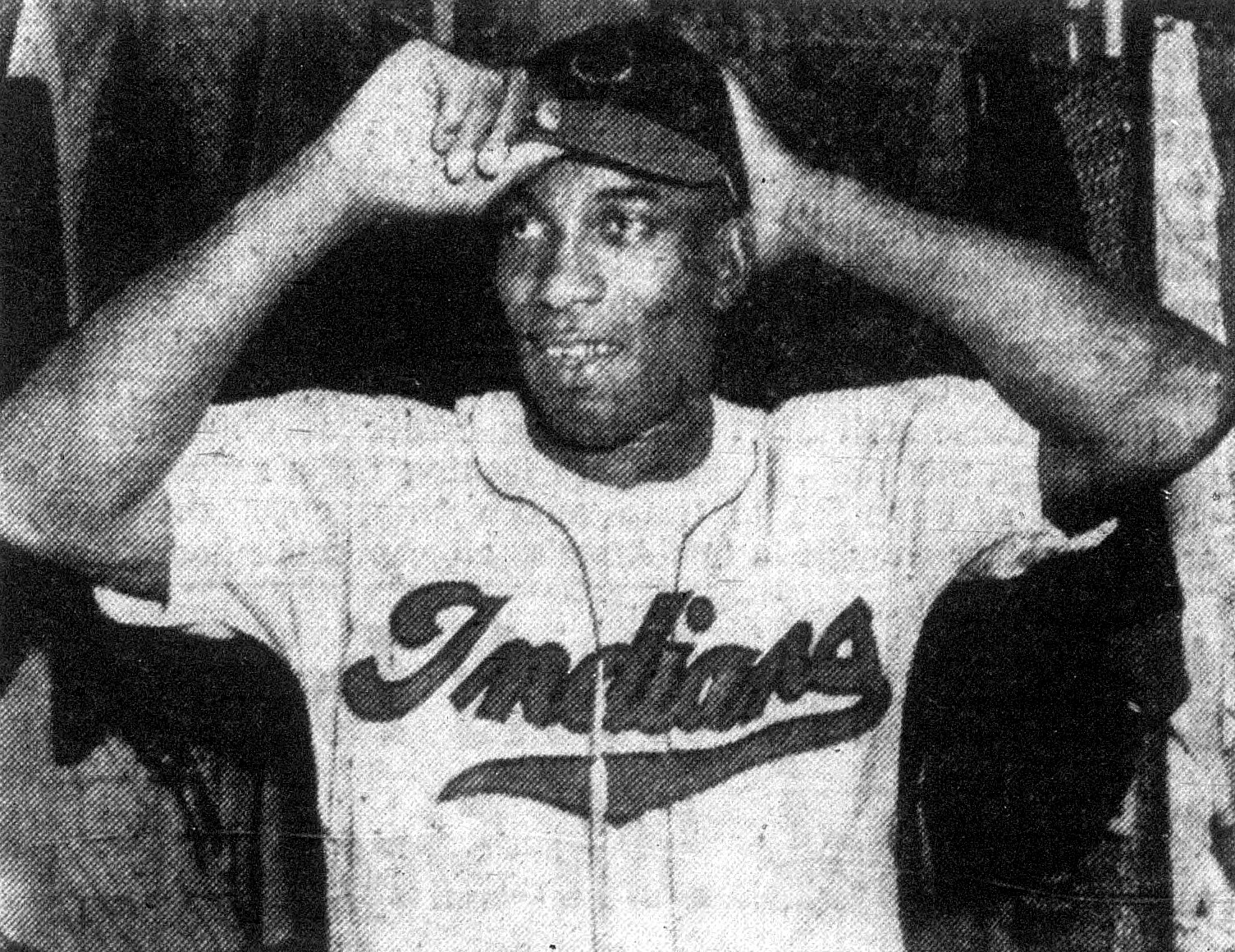
Easter dons his Cleveland Indians cap, circa 1949.

As a 34-year-old rookie, Easter continued his power hitting, ranking among the league leaders in home runs and RBIs, and led the league in times hit by pitch. He continued to produce in 1951 and 1952, finishing 13th in Most Valuable Player voting in the latter year, but ongoing knee and ankle problems, as well as advancing age, brought his major league career to an end. He played in only 68 major league games in 1953, spending part of the year at Triple-A, and finished his major league career with six games in 1954.

Easter continued to play professionally at Triple-A, even though the leg injuries had reduced his running speed to a limp. He played regularly for the Ottawa Athletics, Charleston Senators, Buffalo Bisons, and Rochester Red Wings, and won the International League's MVP award with the Bisons in 1957. He ultimately retired as a player in 1963 at the age of 48 and worked for several years thereafter as a coach. The Rochester Red Wings retired his uniform number used while playing for them (36), as did the Buffalo Bisons (25).

In 2008, Easter was inducted into the International League Hall of Fame.

== Notable home runs ==
As a player, Easter was best known for his powerful home runs, colloquially known as "Easter Eggs." On July 18, 1948, while with the Homestead Grays, Easter became the first player to hit a home run into the center field bleachers at New York's Polo Grounds during game action, a drive estimated at 490 feet. During his rookie season, he also hit the longest home run in the history of Cleveland's Municipal Stadium, a 477-foot blast over the auxiliary scoreboard in right field. The only other player to match that feat was Mickey Mantle, who did it in 1960. Finally, during his twilight days with the Bisons, he became the first player to hit a home run over the center field scoreboard at Buffalo's home park, Offermann Stadium, doing so twice in 1957. On June 14 he cleared the board, and newspapers reported the blow at an estimated 500 feet. On August 15, he hit the board near the top, and it went through a space between the board and a sign just above it.

When told by a fan one time that the fan had seen Easter's longest home run in person, Easter is reported to have replied, "If it came down, it wasn't my longest."

== Post-playing career ==
While playing with the Red Wings, Easter also began to serve as a coach, and, after his playing days were over, he continued in this role. Future major leaguers Boog Powell, Curt Blefary, and Canadian-born Pete Ward were among the players who credited Easter as a positive influence on their careers.

After his days as a coach, Easter returned to the Cleveland area and went to work for the Aircraft Workers Alliance in 1964, eventually becoming the chief union steward for TRW in the east-side suburb of Euclid, Ohio.

== Murder ==
On March 29, 1979, Easter was shot and killed outside a bank at East 260th Street and Euclid Avenue while transporting over $5,000 from payroll checks. Easter was approached by two robbers armed with shotguns and was shot twice at close range after refusing to turn over the funds.

== Tributes ==
In 1980, Woodland Hills Park in Cleveland's Mount Pleasant neighborhood was renamed Luke Easter Park in memoriam. A statue of Easter was also dedicated at his now namesake park.

== Historical analysis ==
Easter was generally well-liked by teammates during his career, and most printed recollections by them refer to him as a good-natured practical joker. He owned and operated a sausage company while in Buffalo, and gave five pounds of sausage to every teammate who hit a home run. He was inducted into the Greater Buffalo Sports Hall of Fame in 1997, with that body citing his "grace and dignity on and off the field" and his "legacy as a friend to the community, a generous soul with plenty of time for any cause." He had already become a charter member of the Buffalo Baseball Hall of Fame in 1985, and of the Rochester Red Wings Hall of Fame in 1989. Ned Garver remembered that his favorite type of pitches to hit were ones "out over the plate and down" in the strike zone.

In The New Bill James Historical Baseball Abstract, baseball writer and statistician Bill James rated Easter as the second-best first baseman in the history of the Negro leagues, behind only Buck Leonard. He described Easter as "an amiable, fun-loving man who gambled, wasn't 100% honest, and had a temper," with "shoulders that crossed three lanes of traffic," but also claimed that "if you could clone him and bring him back, you'd have the greatest power hitter in baseball today, if not ever."

== See also ==
- List of Negro league baseball players who played in Major League Baseball
