= The Case of Paul Peacher =

1936 United States slavery trial

During the height of the Great Depression, Paul Peacher, a sheriff and farmer from Earle, Arkansas, was convicted of enslaving eight African American men to work on his land. For this crime, Peacher lost his title as Sheriff and was sentenced to two years probation. He also had to pay a $3,500 fine, partially paid by the townspeople in Earle.

== Background ==
While the 13th Amendment banned slavery, African Americans who were convicted of crimes were forced to work through the peonage system. Peonage was ubiquitous in slavery states, targeting formerly enslaved people through the Post-Civil War Black Codes. The codes highlighted a wide variety of crimes, such as "all offenses against Religion, Chastity, Morality and Decency." The most common was "vagrancy", which directly targeted formerly enslaved people who were often unable to pay their fines. This created a profitable convict-lease system, especially in southern states, which sold criminals to the highest bidder. These suspected criminals often had their term of service ignored. Due to the widespread use of Black Codes for crimes such as "vagrancy," the system was popular in slavery states to maintain "second class citizenship for blacks."

The progressive era created more peonage violations, which began to be enforced. Enforcement of peonage laws began with the case of Clyatt vs. United States in 1905. S.M Clyatt, a wealthy business owner was charged with illegally arresting two African American men to work at an employees farm. The case gained popularity due to Fred Cubberly, a United States Commissioner. Cubberly wrote articles exposing the level of corruption in the peonage system. Eventually, Clyatt was found guilty and sentenced "to confinement at hard labor for four years."

While the Southern States destroyed the convict labor system in 1925, the system would continue due to the lack of enforcement and oversight by the Federal Government. In the South, Black Codes were still enforced and would remain so until the Civil Rights Act in 1964.

== Paul Peacher ==
Paul Peacher was born on August 15, 1894, in Clarksville, Tennessee. He was married to Minnie Lee Crouch Peacher. The couple had two children: Madeline Douglas Peacher and Paul Edward Peacher. Paul Peacher was the Deputy Sheriff for Crittenden County and the town marshal for Earl. Little is known about his personal life. He was described as a "slim, dark, middle aged man who was prone to violence and profanity." Peacher died in Hot Springs, Arkansas on August 29, 1980.

== Events ==
During the spring of 1936, the Southern Tenant Farmers Union tried to organize a strike of black cotton choppers in Arkansas for better wages and job security. The Union demanded that landowners raise wages from 75 cents to $1.50 and provide seasonal job security. On May 18, STFU organizers called for workers to strike. Sensing violence, Arkansas Governor, J. Marion Futrell set members of the National Guard and state rangers. This action created a media sensation where "The Arkansas Gazette sent its war correspondent to cover the strike." Strikers tried to call attention to their cause by "singing union hymns" and "urging cotton choppers in the field to join them." While the strike was unsuccessful, it was a "public relations success for the STFU." As the STFU began to gain attention, white landowners attempted to silence the strikers with violence through local law enforcement and vigilante groups. As a response, the STFU distributed pamphlets that called "planters "plantation thugs" and law enforcement officers "brutal yellow curs." A breaking point was reached after the strike. On the morning of May 19, a group of angry white planters gathered in the town square. They were angry about the striking cotton choppers taking away their profits. Deputy Paul Peacher was in the group and announced to the angry crowd, "I'd break the strike"

Deputy Paul Peacher held a lot of power. Earl was a small town of 2,000 people, the majority of which were African American. Deputy Peacher was feared by black community members, even "rarely carrying a gun, for he had no fear that any black man would challenge his authority." To "Break the Strike", Peacher drove to the black areas of Earl and began to arrest African Americans on charges of "vagrancy". He planned to take them to his newly acquired land, called Section 16. Section 16 was a 100 acre plot leased to Peacher by the Earle Special School District. The school district made a deal for Peacher to clear the land of trees. In return, Peacher would use the land for two years and keep the lumber he had removed. The STFU strike had caused seven of his ten workers to quit, so Peacher needed a "more reliable form of labor." Peacher then began to drive around looking for potential laborers. He first arrested John Curtus who was on his way to work. After Curtis, he capturing Moses Dunn. Peacher then arrested Winfield Anderson a disabled laborer who was sitting on his porch. Anderson, who was partially paralyzed, attempted to barter with Peacher but was ultimately unsuccessful. On the way to the county jail, Peacher picked up Wesley Millender. At the hands of Peacher, the 13 prisoners were denied food and ultimately refused a trial. At first, the prisoners plead guilty hoping for a lesser punishment. After learning that the fines would be high, Moses Dunn requested a trial. Peacher reluctantly complied, holding a makeshift trial in a back room with no witnesses or testimonies from the defendants. The mayor of Earl, who had heard Peacher's words on May 19, handed down the judgment. All 13 prisoners were fined 25 dollars and sentenced to thirty days of labor on Section 16, Peacher's land.

On May 21, they were taken by truck to Peacher's land. The prisoners were given food and a bed for the night. "Few had any complaints about the work they were forced to do." However, Winfield Anderson, the disabled worker who had been sitting on his porch suffered pain from being forced to use heavy machinery. Section 16 had weak security, and three of the men escaped: Jessie People, James Davis, and DeWitt Irving. Peacher kept the remaining ten men until June 7 when he released them. Surprisingly, a couple of men returned to his farm to work for wages Paul Peacher's abuse would eventually come to an end. The STFU was aware of his illegal arrests and began spreading information around the country. However, it was later determined that most of the men Peacher arrested were not directly affiliated with the labor Union.

== Outcomes ==
Paul Peacher met his downfall through Protestant Minister Dr. Sherwood Eddy, sent by STFU Leader H.L Mitchell to investigate the strike-breaking. The same morning the prisoners arrived, Dr. Eddy arrived at Section 16. He was shown the 13 prisoners without hesitation by the security force. Dr. Eddy demanded Peacher access to the arrest warrants and the court records of the prisoners. As a response, Peacher threatened to have him arrested. Peacher then chased Dr. Eddy off of his farm and said "We'll run Arkansas."

Unfortunately for Peacher, Dr. Eddy had a friend from Yale, who happened to be the Attorney General of the United States. Attorney General Homer Cummings appointed Sam E. Whitaker, who would begin his investigation in Arkansas. Attempting to cover his tracks, conservative Arkansas Governor, J. Marion Futrell hoped to make the problem go away without an investigation. He pardoned the men for the crimes. He ordered them to be released from Section 16. The STFU also began to spread propaganda as soon as the men had arrived, claiming that "A halt must be called to the spread of Hitlerism over the plantations."

Judgment came when the jury met in Little Rock in September 1936. A jury decided to hold Peacher accountable for violating "an 1866 slave-kidnapping law" with his bond set at $2500. Peacher was charged with kidnapping eight of the men. The three that escaped were not his legal responsibility. One of the men, Gossie Grace was found guilty for his crimes and was not added to Peachers' charges. White planters in Arkansas paid to cover Peacher's defense to show their support. His trial took place on November 25. Anderson himself testified against Peacher claiming that he had been removed from his porch, despite his paralyzed arm. On the stand, Peacher claimed, "Why not clean up the town" as his defense. The judge rejected Peacher's defense and sentenced him to no jail time. Instead, he was given two years probation, given a $3,500 fine, and lost his job as Sheriff.

The story resurfaced in 2018 when retired Memphis attorney Carla Peacher-Ryan found a family connection to Paul Peacher as her great-uncle. Peacher-Ryan then realized that her wedding ring, given to her by her step-grandmother, belonged to the wife of Paul Peacher. She subsequently sold the ring at auction for $15,000 in 2022. The money was donated to "the Benjamin L. Hooks Institute for Social Change at the University of Memphis."
