= Louise Boyle =

American photographer

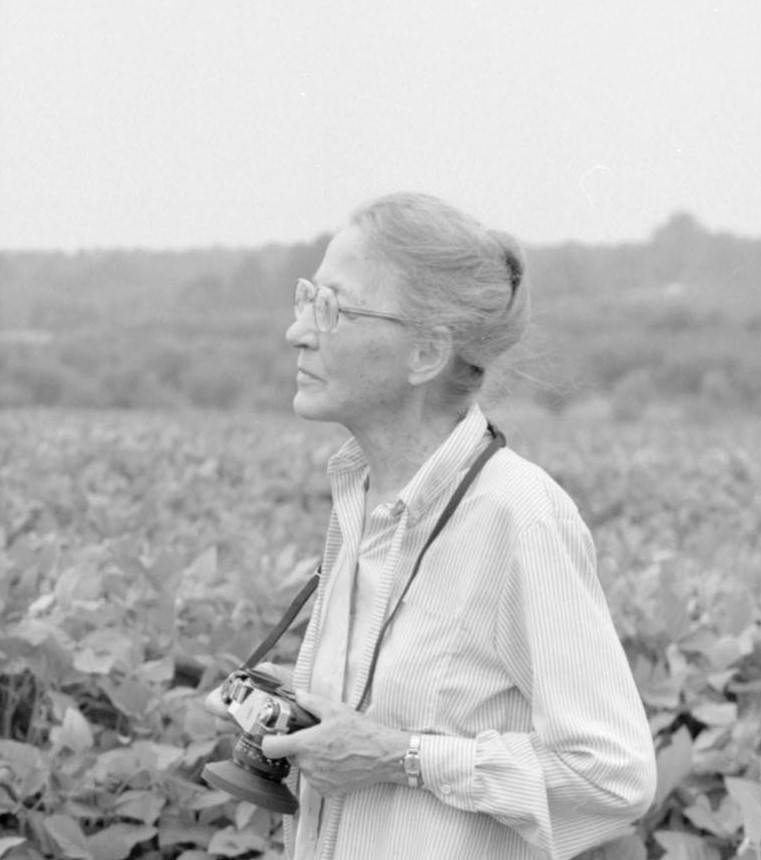
- Louise Boyle in 1982
- Born: February 17, 1910; Grand Forks, North Dakota, U.S.
- Died: December 31, 2005 (aged 95); Ithaca, New York, U.S.
- Education: Vassar College
- Known for: Photography

Louise Boyle (February 17, 1910 – December 31, 2005) was an American photographer known for her images documenting the effects of the Great Depression on farm workers in the South, especially African Americans.

== Life and career ==
Boyle was born in 1910 in Grand Forks, North Dakota, one of two daughters of Effie L. Boyle and James E. Boyle. Her family moved to Ithaca, New York, when she was eight, and she would reside there for most of her adult life. She attended Ithaca High school and went on to graduate from Vassar College.

Boyle studied photography for a time in New York City and thereafter opened a commercial and portrait photography business in Ithaca. One of her earlier bodies of documentary work is a set of photographs of Pennsylvania coal miners she took for Survey Graphic.

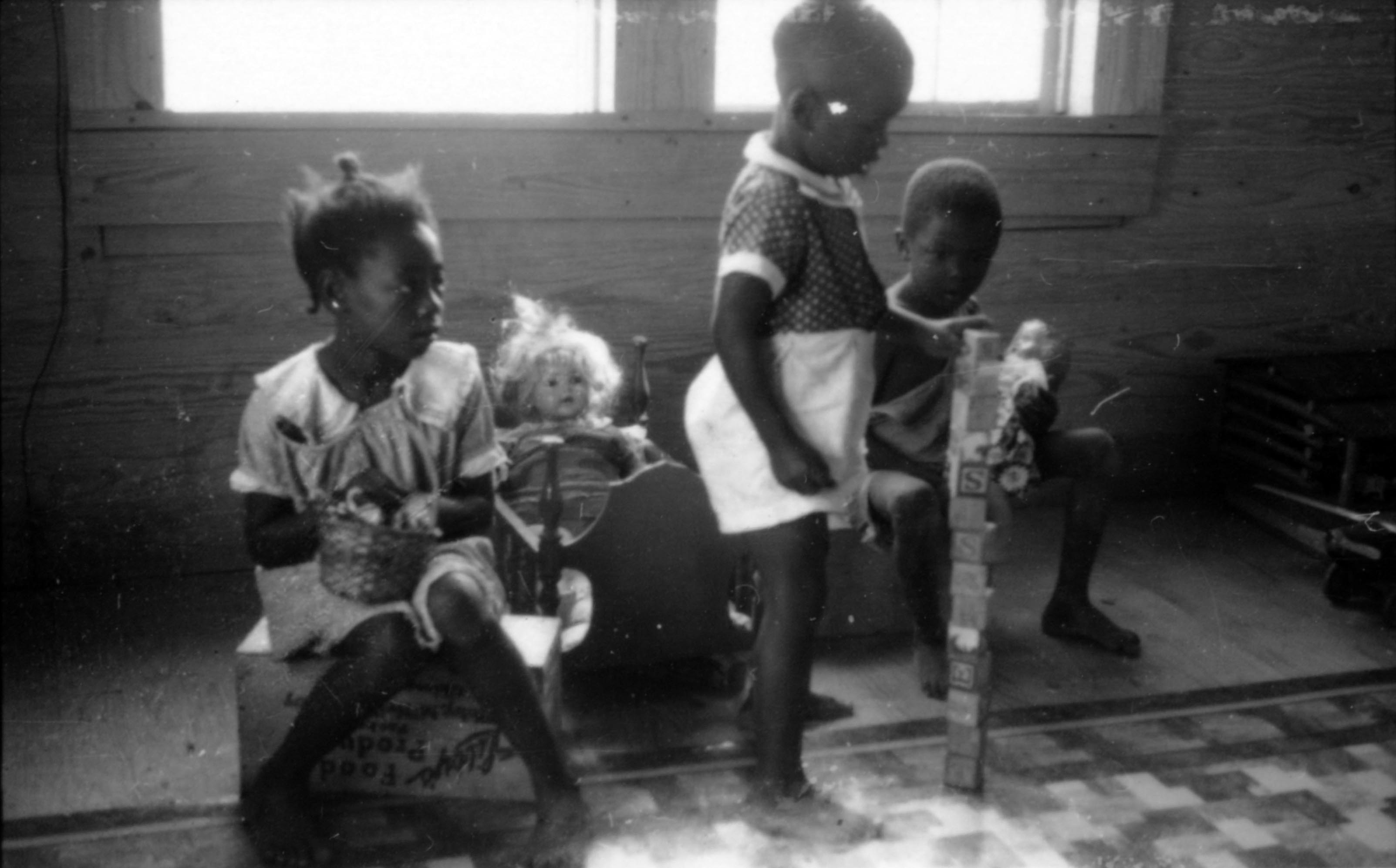
"Three black children playing with dolls and alphabet blocks at Delta Cooperative" by Boyle

Boyle was a member of a group of young socialists who volunteered to help the Southern Tenant Farmers Union (SFTU). In 1937 she was invited to photograph the life and work of Arkansas members of the SFTU, which had been organized three years earlier by struggling tenant farmers. Her photographs, shot with a Leica camera, document farmers and their families in the fields, at home, and at union meetings. Like the work of her contemporaries Walker Evans and Dorothea Lange, her photographs unsparingly show the enormous difficulties faced by Southern farmers in this period, especially African Americans. At the same time, they record the strong communal spirit among Southern labor organizers and farmers. She also deeply studied and supported women's role in labor organizations. More than forty years later, Boyle returned to rephotograph some of the same people and places in 1982.

Boyle served for a time as an editor for the Cornell University Press. A collection of her photographs is held at the Kheel Center, Cornell University, as part of its SFTU-related holdings.

Boyle died in Ithaca on the last day of 2005.

== Work ==
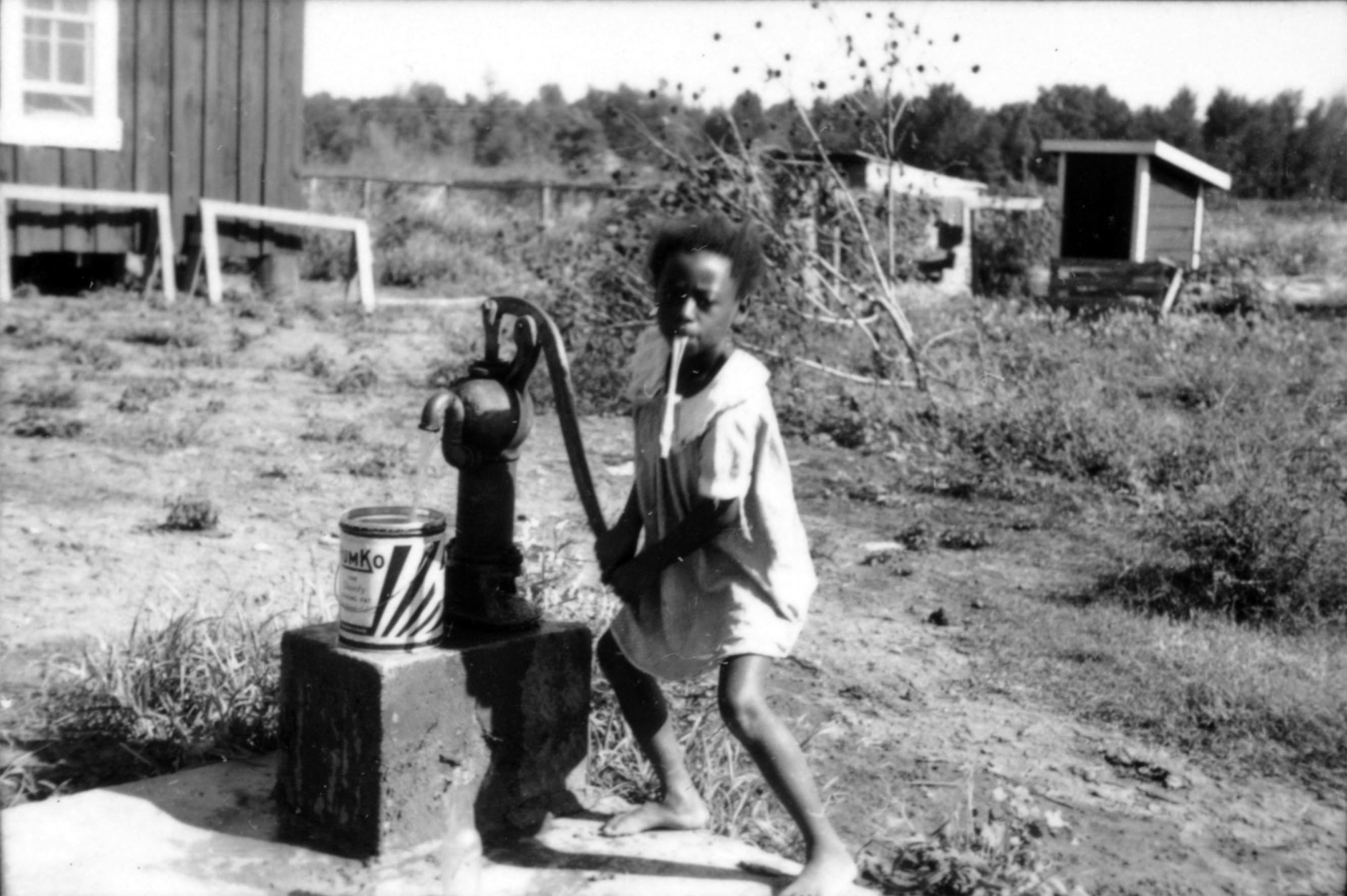
"A young Black girl operates a water pump at Delta Cooperative with balloon in her mouth" by Boyle

Boyle often documented African Americans who persevered through the struggles of the Depression. Especially prominent in her work are the ideas of togetherness and shared struggle. Her photos depict how southern African Americans worked together to form a collective future that would benefit everyone. Many of her photos show African Americans picking cotton, working for unions, or just living daily life in their homes.

== Publications ==
- Payne, Elizabeth Anne Payne, and Louise Boyle. "The Lady Was a Sharecropper: Myrtle Lawrence and the Southern Tenant Farmers' Union." Southern Cultures 4:2 (1998), pp. 5–27.
