= Southern Tenant Farmers Union =

Labor union organization

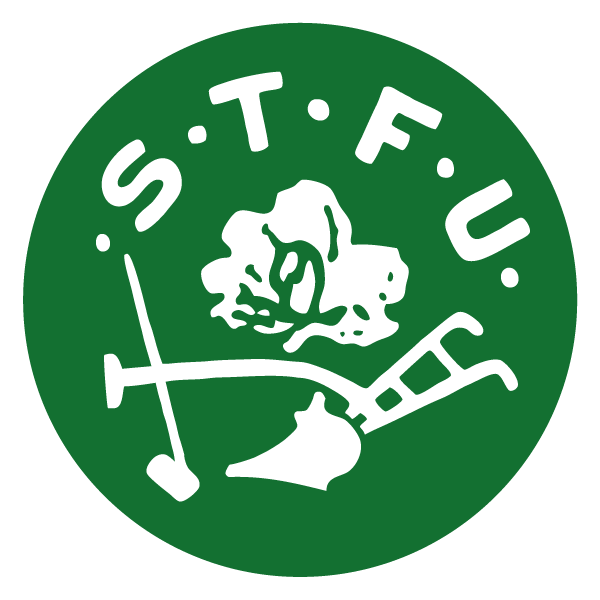
- Abbreviation: S.T.F.U.
- Merged into: Amalgamated Meat Cutters and Butcher Workmen
- Founded: July 18, 1934
- Dissolved: July 29, 1960 (26 years and 11 days)
- Headquarters: Tyronza, Arkansas; later Memphis, Tennessee
- Location: American South
- Members: 35,000 (peak)
- Key people: H. L. Mitchell; Clay East; E. B. McKinney
- Affiliations: CIO; UCAPAWA; AFL; UFW

The Southern Tenant Farmers Union (STFU), later known as the National Farm Labor Union, the National Agricultural Workers Union, and the Agricultural and Allied Workers Union, was founded as a civil farmer's union to organize tenant farmers in the Southern United States. Many such tenant farmer sharecroppers were Black descendants of former slaves.

Originally set up in July 1934 during the Great Depression, the STFU was founded to help sharecroppers and tenant farmers get better arrangements from landowners. They were eager to improve their share of profit or subsidies and working conditions. The STFU was established as a response to policies of the Agricultural Adjustment Administration (AAA). Part of the New Deal, the AAA was a program to reduce production in order to increase prices of commodities; landowners were paid subsidies, which they were supposed to pass on to their tenants. The program was designed by President Franklin D. Roosevelt to help revive the United States' agricultural industry and to recharge the depressed economy.

The AAA called for a reduction in food production, which would, through a controlled shortage of food, raise the price for any given food item through supply and demand. The desired effect was that the agricultural industry would prosper due to the increased value and produce more income for farmers. In order to decrease food production, the AAA paid farmers to hold some of their land out of production; the money was paid to the landowners. The landowners were expected to share this money with the tenant farmers. While a small percentage of the landowners did share the income, the majority did not.

The Southern Tenant Farmers Union was one of few unions in the 1930s that was open to all races. They promoted non-violent protest to gain their fair share of the AAA money. They also promoted the goal of blacks and whites working efficiently together. The Farmers Union met with harsh resistance from the landowners and local public officials. The Southern Tenant Farmers Union leaders were often harassed, attacked and many were killed.

In the 1930s the union was active in Arkansas, Oklahoma, Mississippi, Missouri, Tennessee and Texas. It later spread into the southeastern states and to California, sometimes affiliating with larger national labor federations. Its headquarters was mainly at Memphis, Tennessee. From 1948 to 1960, when it was dissolved, the STFU was based at Washington, D.C.

== History ==
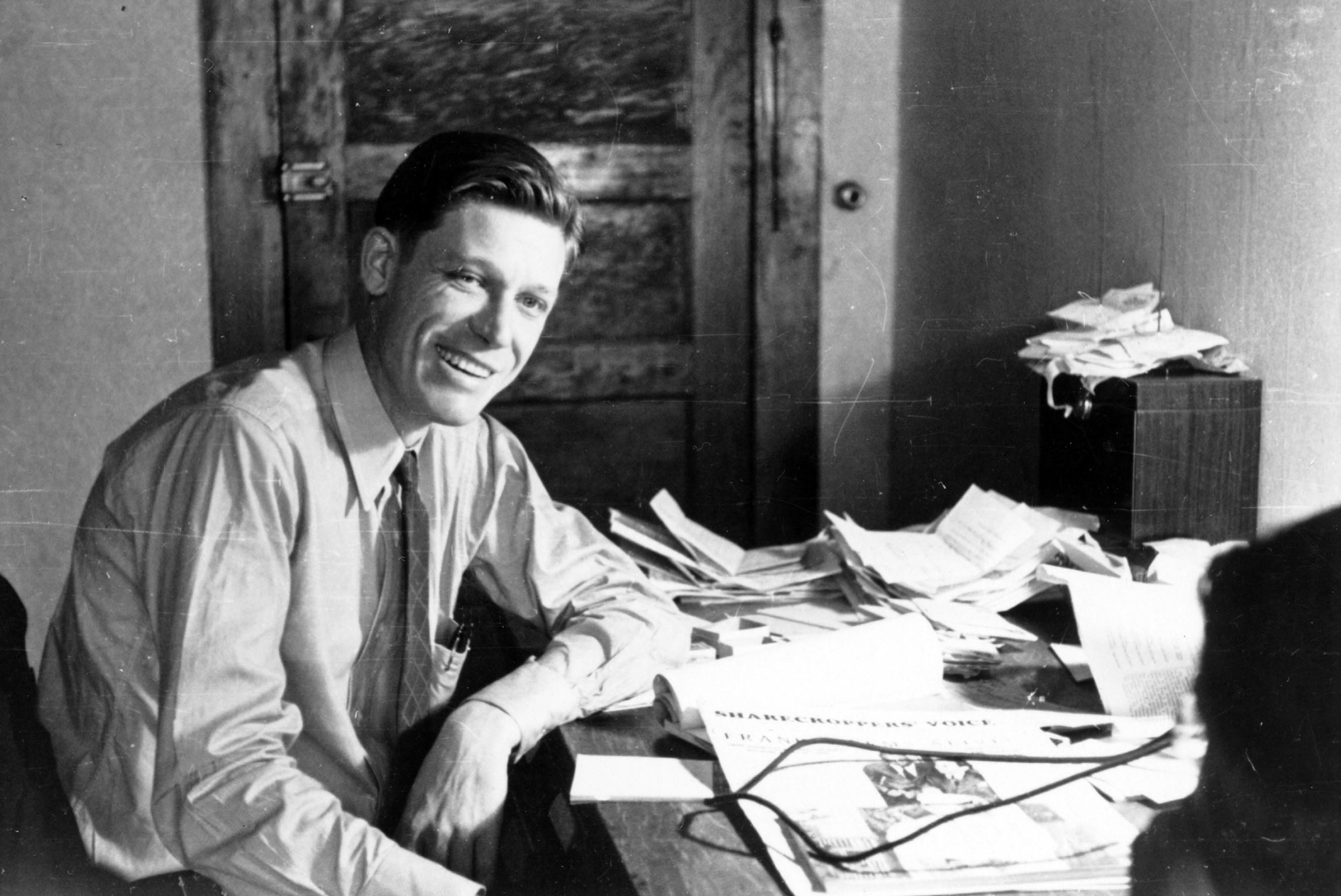
H. L. Mitchell, executive secretary and later president of the Union (by Louise Boyle)

Agriculture in the south never fully recovered after the overproduction of crops during World War I. Additionally, natural disasters in the 1920s and 1930s prepared an agricultural deterioration in southern states. When the Great Depression started, the southern agriculture sector had inherited weak foundations. In order to alleviate this sector, the federal government under the Franklin D. Roosevelt Administration, through the New Deal, started economic incentives to reduce the production output of plantations; thereby, decreasing the number of sharecroppers and farmers needed in the fields.

The implications of the policies from the AAA caused unemployment and the eviction of tenant farmers to rise dramatically. Harry Leland Mitchell (better known as H. L. Mitchell), a socialist and sharecropper, and Clay East, a gasoline station owner, realized that the federal subsidies went mainly to the plantation owners and left tenant farmers and sharecroppers unemployed without any aid from the federal government. East and Mitchell created the Unemployed League with other farmers in Tyronza, Arkansas, in the Arkansas Delta, to fight the local plantation owners' retention of federal relief payments under the New Deal. The Unemployed League was able to distribute this aid among the land workers of Delta; soon after the league disbanded.

The cause and organization were revived in 1934 when the STFU was created. STFU's main goal was to advocate for the distribution of New Deal subsidies from plantation owners to tenant farmers. Later on, the leadership of STFU decided to make the union an established collective bargaining organization, similar to the industrial unions in big cities. However, it never reached a formal bargaining position because plantation owners used violence and intimidation against the STFU leadership and its members; for instance, the union's president, William H. Stultz, was arrested and threatened with death, and the visiting Director of western Arkansas's Commonwealth College, Lucien Koch, was seized at an STFU meeting, beaten and jailed.

One of the first actions taken by the union was the filing of a lawsuit against Hiram Norcross. This was to ensure that the rights of sharecroppers under the AAA were protected and that they received a share from the government subsidies as the act envisioned.

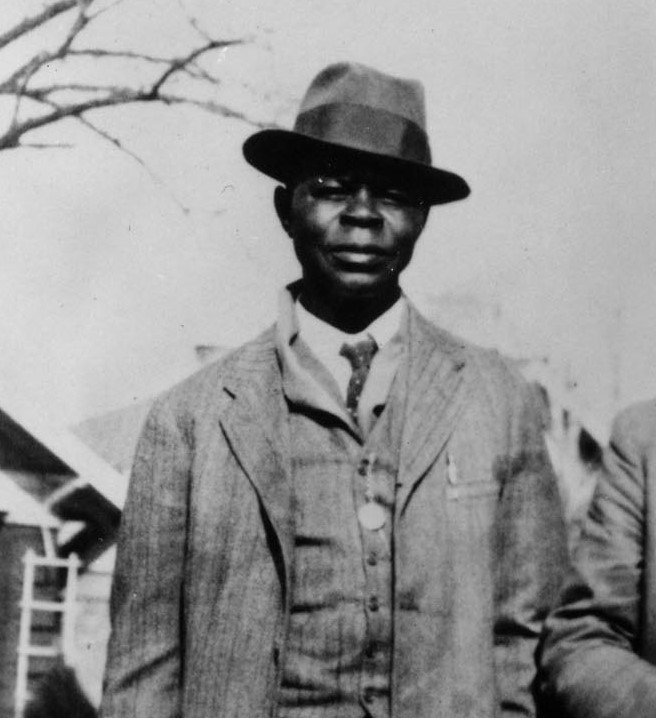
E. B. McKinney

The union wrote many letters protesting the eviction of hundreds of farmers. The STFU sent five men to Washington to carry out an appeal to the Secretary of Agriculture Henry A. Wallace. Two African Americans, E. B. McKinney and N. W. Webb, were chosen to go to Washington to denounce the continual eviction of tenant farmers.

The first strike of the STFU was in 1935. Cotton pickers were demanding a better pay rate. Cotton planters wanted to pay forty cents per one-hundred pounds that fall season of 1935 but the union, under H. L. Mitchell's direction, demanded one dollar. After a few days of the strike, many cotton plantations offered seventy-five cents and fewer offered a dollar. This marked the union's first victory.

The STFU in 1936 went on strike to raise wages to $1.50 a day. However, the vote was taken three months before the strike was due to begin. Landowners and law enforcement organized a campaign of violence and persecution against striking sharecroppers. Union members were beaten, jailed, and many were forced to flee the region. Black sharecroppers were often jailed to force them onto prison farms. Roosevelt was initially quietly sympathetic, but failed to respond to the violence so as not to alienate Senate Majority Leader Joseph T. Robinson. STFU attempted to plead their case to Roosevelt when he visited Arkansas during the middle of the violence, but were rebuffed.

In 1939, STFU activists organized protests by hundreds of cotton sharecroppers in the Bootheel district of southeastern Missouri, alleging there were mass evictions of tenants by landlords who did not wish to share federal AAA checks with them. The Farm Security Administration, a New Deal agency, responded by providing low-cost rental housing for 500 cropper families. In 1939 they paid $500,000 in grants to 11,000 families in the Bootheel. The protest fizzled out as Communist and Socialist elements battled for control and STFU membership plunged.

During World War II, the STFU leadership recommended its members find work outside of the plantation fields of Arkansas. They set up an "underground railroad" to transport more than 10,000 workers to jobs in the northern and eastern regions of the United States. After World War II, the STFU changed their name to the National Farm Labor Union and were chartered by the American Federation of Labor. From these changes, the organization began operating in California. In this state the NFLU was involved in the DiGiorgio Fruit Corporation strike of 1947. After a year and a half on strike, the union succeeded in improving conditions for its workers. The union organized 30,000 men and women to coordinate a strike in Corcoran, California. The strike was to fight against wage cuts for cotton pickers. The strike succeeded in regaining or increasing the workers' wages.

== Relationship with other organizations ==
When the Congress of Industrial Organizations (CIO) created its agricultural affiliate, the United Cannery, Agricultural, Packing, and Allied Workers of America (UCAPAWA), the STFU saw an opportunity to become stronger and joined them. However, a series of strategic and ideological disputes with the UCAPAWA communist leadership made the STFU resolve to leave the CIO in 1939. After the end of the alliance, UCAPAWA decided to leave the agricultural field and concentrate its labor campaign on food-processing workers.

The Communist Party by 1934 was willing to form alliances with progressives and socialists. It began to assist agricultural workers to allied various organizations from the South in order to create a stronger Popular Front. The STFU was among many unions to take part in this Popular Front. The STFU benefited from its association with the Communist Party because the organizations in the Front supported each other in protests and fights against plantation owners. Not every member of the STFU belonged to the Communist Party. Relatively few members considered themselves to be Communists; the rest belonged to many different political parties or ideologies.

The STFU was not entirely comfortable in its alliance with the Communist Party. Many problems between the STFU and the Communist Party (such as mismanagement of funds, lack of financial support from the party delaying the union's mission, conflict of interests between the organizations and minimal interest of the Communist Party toward STFU members) broke the alliance. By separating themselves from the Communist Party, the union maintained its alliance between white and black workers and members, which was crucial to its identity and program.

== Union leadership ==
Federal relief enacted by the Agricultural Adjustment Act (AAA) was distributed mainly to plantation owners. The AAA was a New Deal program that was supposed to reduce food production and increase food prices; this was intended to improve the agricultural economy. Once again, Mitchell, East, and liberal members of the Agricultural Adjustment Administration observed that this program had negative effects on land workers, leaving many unemployed. Therefore, they created and became the leaders of the Southern Tenant Farmers Union (STFU) to fight this maldistribution.

The leadership of STFU upheld Mitchell and East attracted many socialists and pro-New Deal liberals to the Union. Furthermore, Clay East was able to promote socialist ideas within Tyronza through his leadership position by distribution its most successful journal, American Guardian, edited by Oscar Ameringer. Due to East's success in selling a large amount of subscriptions, the small town became known as "Red Square." Moreover, about a 1000 people signed up to the socialist organizations that included a small but significant amount of African Americans.

Leaders of the union decided to organize a rank and file leadership due to the pressure of its members. The union soon discovered that a rank and file leadership was difficult to organize. Some farm worker wanted to transform the union into a fascist militant group and others wanted to run the union like a corporation; but as the union membership increased, land worker leadership also improved.

== Race ==
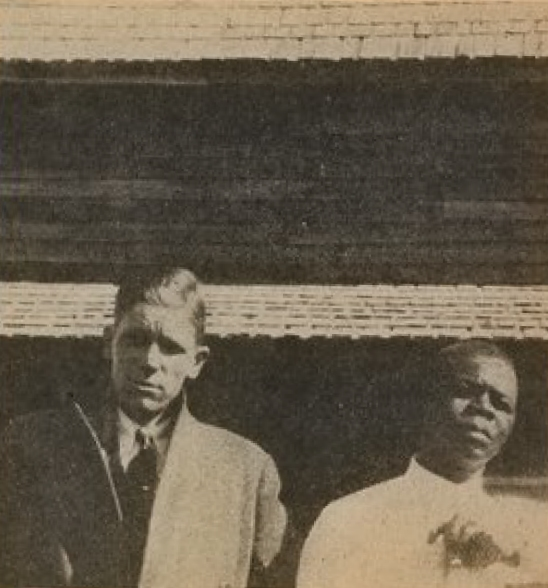
H. L. Mitchell, secretary of the Southern Tenant Farmers Union, and E. B. McKinney, vice-president

The first chapters of the STFU did not go through racial tensions since blacks and white lived and worked closely. However, when the STFU reached large towns, racial antagonisms were prominent since interracial relations were less frequent in these highly populated regions. In these towns the STFU created black and white localities, with their racially respective organizers to gain confidence from their union members. The union sent white organizers to the localities composed of white people. Similarly, the union sent African-Americans to localities composed of African-Americans. E. B. McKinney was an organizer and the first African American to become vice president of the union. Before becoming vice president of the Union he was an active participator in the Socialist party along with Clay East. Owen Whitfield was another African-American leader associated with the STFU.

Even though racial antagonisms were deeply rooted in the South, the STFU was able to create interracial cooperation within the union. In Marked Tree, Arkansas, the African-American local invited the white local to their meeting. In this meeting white and blacks sat in the same room and worked for a common purpose. This led Mitchell to believe that the creation of a racially united movement was possible in other regions. Indeed, most of the important union events and meetings took place in interracial settings.

Even though Mitchell wanted an interracial union, he observed drastic behavioral differences between blacks and whites. African-Americans in the union had a strong collective conscience and unity; therefore, through their unity they were more capable of resisting repressions through collective action. On the other hand, whites were more individualistic and were easier for managers to coerce.

== See also ==
- Louise Boyle, photographer who documented STFU farmers in Arkansas in 1937
- STFU publications
- The case of Paul Peacher

== Bibliography ==
- Auerbach, Jerold S. "Southern Tenant Farmers: Socialist Critics of the New Deal." Labor History, vol. 7 (1966), pp. 3–18.
- Cantor, Louis. "A Prologue to the Protest Movement: The Missouri Sharecropper Roadside Demonstration of 1939," The Journal of American History, vol. 55, no. 4 (1969), pp. 804–822 in JSTOR
- Cobb, William H. "The Southern Tenant Farmers Union." The Encyclopedia of Arkansas History & Culture. http://encyclopediaofarkansas.net/encyclopedia/entry-detail.aspx?entryID=35
- Dyson, Lowell K. "The Southern Tenant Farmers Union and Depression Politics." Political Science Quarterly, vol. 88 (1973), pp. 230–252.
- Grubbs, Donald H. Cry from the Cotton: The Southern Tenant Farmers Union and the New Deal. Chapel Hill, NC: University of North Carolina Press, 1971.
- Honey, Michael K. Sharecropper's Troubadour: John L. Handcox, the Southern Tenant Farmers Union, and the African American Song Tradition. New York: Palgrave Macmillan, 2021.
- Kester, Howard (1997). Revolt among the sharecroppers. Knoxville: University of Tennessee Press. ISBN 9780870499753. OCLC 35637419. Reprint of 1936 publication.
- Manthorne, Jason. "The View from the Cotton: Reconsidering the Southern Tenant Farmers Union." Agricultural History, 84, 1 (2010), pp. 20–45 JSTOR 40607621
- Mitchell, H. L. (Winter 1973). "The Founding and Early History of the Southern Tenant Farmers Union". The Arkansas Historical Quarterly. 32 (4): 342–369. doi:10.2307/40027642. JSTOR 40027642.
- Mitchell, H. L. (1979). Mean things happening in this land : the life and times of H. L. Mitchell, co-founder of the Southern Tenant Farmers Union. Allanheld, Osmun. ISBN 9780916672256. OCLC 5103152.
- Naison, Mark D. (1996). "The Southern Tenant Farmers Union and the CIO". In Lynd, Staughton (ed.). "We are all leaders": the alternative unionism of the early 1930s. Urbana: University of Illinois Press. pp. 103–116. ISBN 0252065476. OCLC 247133530.
- Ross Jr., James D. "I ain't got no home in this world": The Rise and Fall of the Southern Tenant Farmers Union in Arkansas. Ph.D. dissertation. Auburn University, 2004.
