= National Register of Historic Places listings in Poinsett County, Arkansas =

Location of Poinsett County in Arkansas

This is a list of the National Register of Historic Places listings in Poinsett County, Arkansas.

This is intended to be a complete list of the properties and districts on the National Register of Historic Places in Poinsett County, Arkansas, United States.

There are 21 properties and districts listed on the National Register in the county, and one former listing.

Contents: Counties in Arkansas
- Arkansas
- Ashley
- Baxter
- Benton
- Boone
- Bradley
- Calhoun
- Carroll
- Chicot
- Clark
- Clay
- Cleburne
- Cleveland
- Columbia
- Conway
- Craighead
- Crawford
- Crittenden
- Cross
- Dallas
- Desha
- Drew
- Faulkner
- Franklin
- Fulton
- Garland
- Grant
- Greene
- Hempstead
- Hot Spring
- Howard
- Independence
- Izard
- Jackson
- Jefferson
- Johnson
- Lafayette
- Lawrence
- Lee
- Lincoln
- Little River
- Logan
- Lonoke
- Madison
- Marion
- Miller
- Mississippi
- Monroe
- Montgomery
- Nevada
- Newton
- Ouachita
- Perry
- Phillips
- Pike
- Poinsett
- Polk
- Pope
- Prairie
- Pulaski (Little Rock)
- Randolph
- St. Francis
- Saline
- Scott
- Searcy
- Sebastian
- Sevier
- Sharp
- Stone
- Union
- Van Buren
- Washington
- White
- Woodruff
- Yell

This National Park Service list is complete through NPS recent listings posted January 16, 2026.

== Current listings ==
	Name on the Register	Image	Date listed	Location	City or town	Description
1	Bacon Hotel	Bacon Hotel	December 13, 1995 (#95001437)	Southeastern corner of the junction of Homestead Rd. and a railroad line 35°28′48″N 90°44′05″W	Whitehall	
2	Emrich and Beley Cotton Gin		January 16, 2026 (#100012575)	SE corner of Davis Street and Memphis Avenue; 35°29′35″N 90°21′40″W	Tyronza	
3	Harrisburg Commercial Historic District	Harrisburg Commercial Historic District	September 18, 2009 (#09000736)	Roughly bounded by Jackson, Water, South, and Gould Sts. 35°33′48″N 90°43′02″W	Harrisburg	
4	Highway A-7, Bridges Historic District	Highway A-7, Bridges Historic District	May 12, 2009 (#09000318)	Old U.S. Route 63 over Ditch No. 1 and its reliefs 35°30′58″N 90°23′50″W	Marked Tree	Historic Bridges of Arkansas MPS
5	Highway A-7, Ditch No. 6 Bridge	Highway A-7, Ditch No. 6 Bridge	May 20, 2009 (#09000319)	E. Davis St. over Ditch No. 6, southeast of Steel Bridge Rd. 35°28′55″N 90°20′37″W	Tyronza	
6	Highway A-7, Tyronza Segment	Highway A-7, Tyronza Segment	May 20, 2009 (#09000320)	Old U.S. Route 63 between Memphis Ave. and the Tyronza River; 35°29′59″N 90°22′15″W	Tyronza	
7	Hubbard Rice Dryer	Hubbard Rice Dryer	October 1, 2004 (#04001070)	15015 Senteney Rd. 35°40′04″N 90°45′54″W	Weiner	
8	Judd Hill Cotton Gin	Judd Hill Cotton Gin	September 28, 2005 (#05001080)	Highway 214 east of Bridgewood Rd. 35°36′12″N 90°31′06″W	Judd Hill	
9	Willie Lamb Post No. 26 American Legion Hut	Willie Lamb Post No. 26 American Legion Hut	January 8, 2003 (#02001674)	205 Alexander St. 35°36′44″N 90°19′52″W	Lepanto	
10	Lepanto Commercial Historic District	Lepanto Commercial Historic District	September 21, 2009 (#09000743)	Roughly bounded by Holmes St., the Little River, Dewey St., and Alexander Ave. 35°36′41″N 90°19′49″W	Lepanto	
11	Marked Tree Commercial Historic District	Marked Tree Commercial Historic District	September 18, 2009 (#09000735)	Elm St. between Liberty and Frisco Sts.; Frisco St. between Elm and Nathan Sts. 35°31′57″N 90°25′18″W	Marked Tree	
12	Marked Tree Lock and Siphons	Marked Tree Lock and Siphons	May 2, 1988 (#88000431)	On the St. Francis River; 35°35′10″N 90°25′47″W	Marked Tree	
13	Modern News Building	Modern News Building	June 18, 1976 (#76000447)	216 N. Main St. 35°33′50″N 90°43′30″W	Harrisburg	
14	Poinsett Community Club	Poinsett Community Club	October 9, 1986 (#86002847)	Main and Poinsett Sts. 35°40′18″N 90°30′45″W	Trumann	
15	Poinsett County Courthouse	Poinsett County Courthouse	November 3, 1989 (#89001876)	Bounded by Market, East, Court, and Main Sts. 35°33′47″N 90°43′02″W	Harrisburg	
16	Poinsett Lumber and Manufacturing Company Manager's House	Poinsett Lumber and Manufacturing Company Manager's House	January 21, 2010 (#09001257)	512 Poinsett Ave. 35°40′29″N 90°31′01″W	Trumann	
17	Rivervale Inverted Siphons	Rivervale Inverted Siphons	March 22, 1991 (#91000339)	Just southwest of Highway 135 across the Little River; 35°40′19″N 90°20′21″W	Rivervale	
18	St. Anthony's Catholic Church Historic District		April 10, 2024 (#100009344)	407 Kings Hwy. 35°37′11″N 90°54′15″W	Weiner	
19	Tyronza Commercial Historic District	Tyronza Commercial Historic District	July 29, 2010 (#09000896)	S. Main St. bounded on the north by Old U.S. Highway 63 and on the south by Mullins St. 35°29′27″N 90°21′31″W	Tyronza	
20	Tyronza Methodist Episcopal Church, South	Tyronza Methodist Episcopal Church, South	May 26, 2015 (#15000260)	161 Church St. 35°29′24″N 90°21′35″W	Tyronza	
21	Tyronza Water Tower	Tyronza Water Tower	September 20, 2007 (#07000963)	Northwest of the junction of Main St. and Oliver St. 35°29′24″N 90°21′30″W	Tyronza	

== Former listings ==
	Name on the Register	Image	Date listed	Date removed	Location	City or town	Description
1	Maxie Theatre	Maxie Theatre	April 7, 2011 (#10000933)	September 8, 2020	136 Arkansas Highway 463 S. 35°40′14″N 90°30′59″W	Trumann	

== See also ==
- List of National Historic Landmarks in Arkansas
- National Register of Historic Places listings in Arkansas
