= H. L. Mitchell =

American agricultural workers union leader

Harry Leland Mitchell
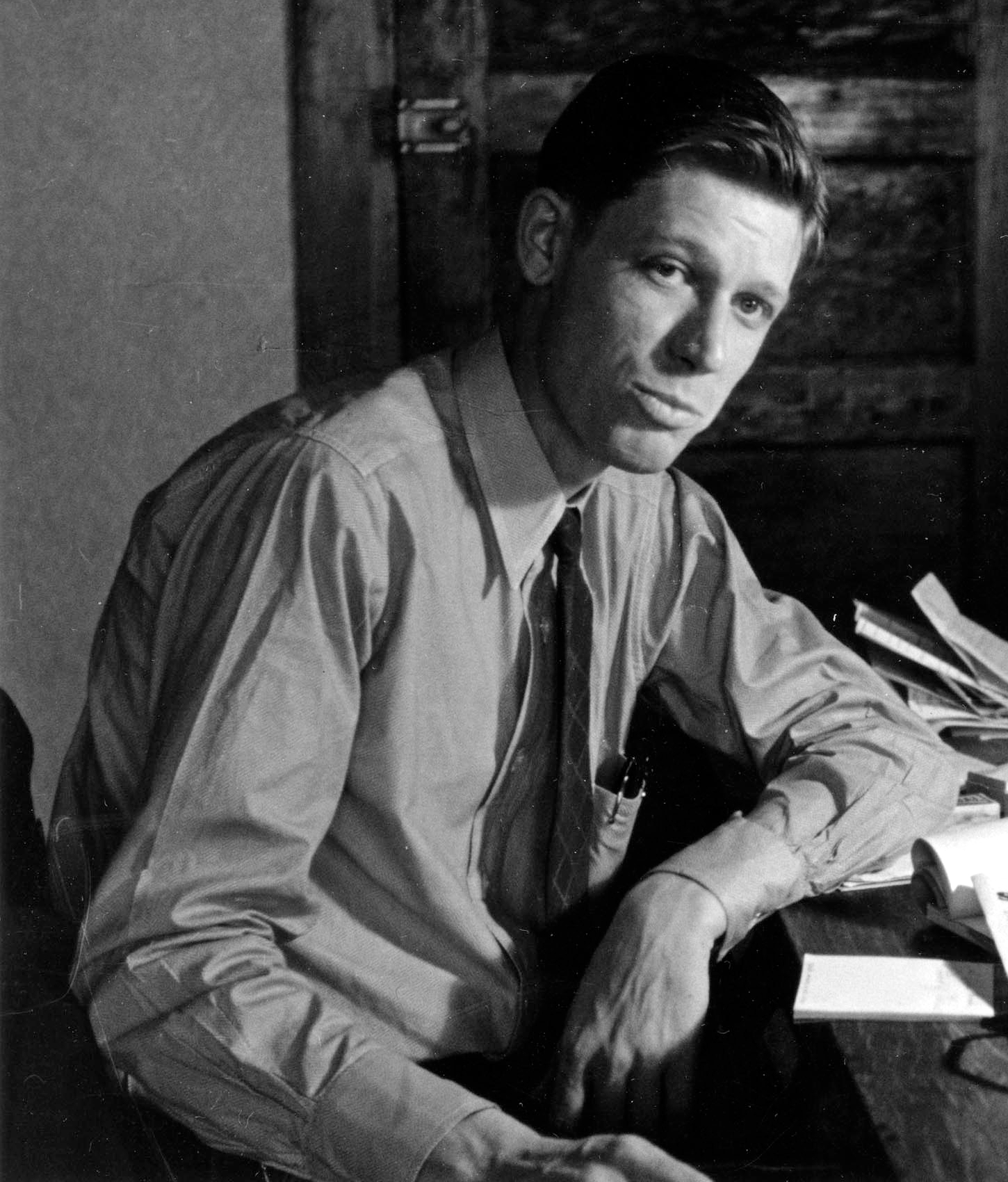
- Portrait by Louise Boyle, 1937
- Born: June 14, 1906. Halls, Tennessee
- Died: August 1, 1989 (aged 83); Montgomery, Alabama
- Resting place: Greenwood Cemetery (Montgomery, Alabama)
- Education: Halls High School (Knox County, Tennessee), graduated 1924
- Occupations: Sharecropper, union organizer
- Years active: 1934–1973
- Employer(s): Southern Tenant Farmers Union (STFU), National Farm Labor Union (NFLU), National Agricultural Workers Union (NAWU)
- Known for: Farmworkers union leader; organizing the STFU with Clay East
- Notable work: Mean Things Happening In This Land
- Title: Executive Secretary STFU (1934–1939, 1941–1944), President NFLU (1945–1955) and NAWU (1955–1960)
- Spouses: Lyndell "Dell" Cannack (1926–c. 1940), Dorothy Dowe (1951–1989)
- Children: Harry L. Mitchell Jr., Samuel Howard Mitchell, Mrs. Joe Freeland
- Father: James Y. Mitchell
- Relatives: Edwin Mitchell (brother)

Harry Leland Mitchell (June 14, 1906 – January 8, 1989) was an American union leader. He was a cofounder and leader of the Southern Tenant Farmers Union (STFU) in 1934, and led its successor unions, for most of the next twenty-six years. He had been a sharecropper himself, and a socialist like his fellow instigator of the STFU, Clay East. They led an initially small racially mixed union of poor people within three years to a membership of some 30,000 tenant farmers and sharecroppers. As the STFU evolved through association with larger, more powerful unions, it changed its name, and Mitchell his official role. He was President of the National Farm Labor Union (NFLU), then of the National Agricultural Workers Union (NAWU), before retiring in 1960. In 1979, he published a memoir concerned almost entirely with his organizing activities.

== Early life ==
The first memory recorded in the autobiography of H. L. Mitchell — as he preferred to be named, although he also said, "Just call me Mitch" — is his horror at witnessing the lynching of a Black delivery boy who was burned to death.

Mitchell was born about 65 miles NE of Memphis, Tennessee, near the small Tennessee town of Halls. His father, Jim Mitchell, was a tenant farmer and a preacher. As a pre-teen, H. L. was the town paper boy, learning about the world by shouting out headlines, or making up plausible ones, to sell three Memphis newspapers. Other childhood labor, from age 8 and extending into young manhood at 20, was seasonal agricultural work in the cotton and strawberry fields. In 1920, exposed to the Eugene V. Debs presidential campaign and a local supporter of it, who gave him books to read, Mitchell became a Socialist. Initially inspired to learn about Darwinian evolution, because it was a subject of controversy in Tennessee, Mitchell began buying Little Blue Books, a habit he retained for years; thus gaining exposure to ancient and modern philosophers as well as the work of Marx, Engels, and the plays of Shakespeare.

Shortly after graduating high school in 1924, Mitchell became a sharecropper near Ripley, Tennessee, about 13 miles SE of Halls. In 1926, on the day after Christmas (i.e., on December 26), he married a schoolteacher, Lyndell Carmack, known as "Dell" (and surnamed "Cannack" in some sources. With no other employment, he sharecropped on Lyndell's parents' farm. Lyndell gave birth to a son, Harry Leland Mitchell, Jr.

In 1927, the young Mitchell family moved to Tyronza, Arkansas, where Jim Mitchell had a popular barber shop and was urging his son to relocate to where the cotton crop grew more abundantly. H. L. had visited Tyronza to consider sharecropping there, but didn't like the minimal amenities offered to the Arkansas workers and was about to return to sharecrop again on his in-laws' land. His father kept him in Tyronza by giving him the use of a pressing machine in the back of his barber shop. H. L. went into the dry cleaning business, scouring the back roads for customers and finding those with enough funds to have their clothes cleaned, pressed, and delivered.

== Career ==
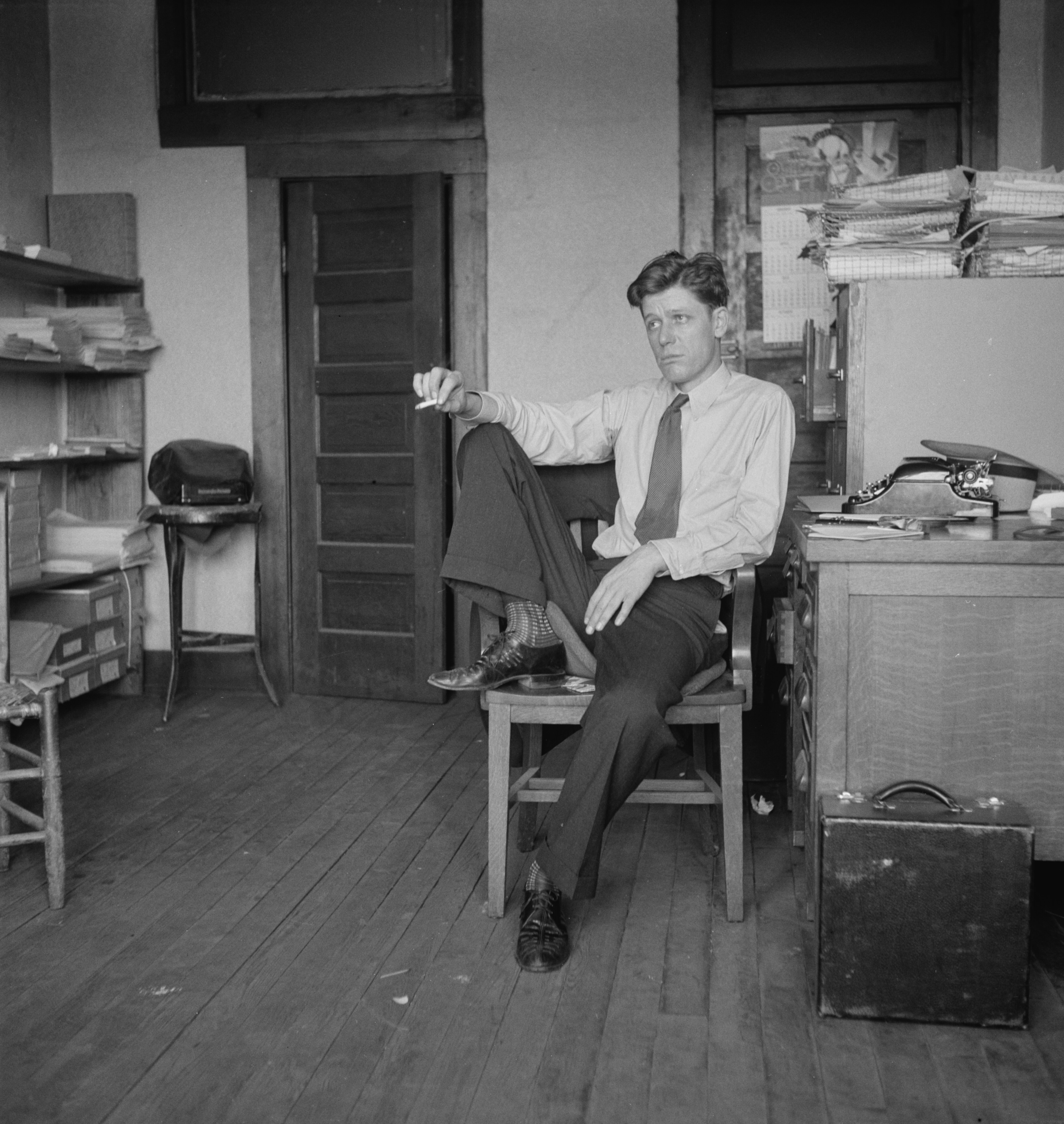
Portrait by Dorothea Lange, 1938

The autobiography of H. L. Mitchell, Mean Things Happening in This Land, provides the most information about Mitchell's life and career.

In Tyronza, Mitchell came into repeated contact with the owner of one of the three gas stations in town, Clay East. It being the Great Depression, East had concluded that the economic system was a problem. Mitchell told East that East's ideas were socialist, which East didn't like the sound of. But Mitchell loaned him a copy of Letters to Judd, an American Workingman by Upton Sinclair, and East was then persuaded. Mitchell and East campaigned for the Socialist Party's candidate, Norman Thomas, in the 1932 Presidential election.

Wanting to know more about the Socialist movement, Mitchell planned an automobile drive to Washington, D. C. for the Continental Congress for Economic Reconstruction. At stops on his journey, he met various activists, bringing one from Memphis to the Nashville home of Howard Kester, who was to become important in Mitchell's union activities. At the Congress, which included some delegates' calls for an immediate socialistic takeover of the government (defused by the pragmatic leadership), Norman Thomas led a demonstration of some 500 meeting participants to the Cairo Hotel, which had refused to provide already paid-up rooms to the union leader A. Philip Randolph with his delegation of fellow African-American attendees. Thomas's speech attacking racial segregation was profoundly enlightening for Mitchell, who recalled much later: "It had never occurred to me that it was wrong. Negroes had their place, and we had ours." (The hotel refunded the money.)

=== Southern Tenant Farmers Union ===
==== Origins and early years ====
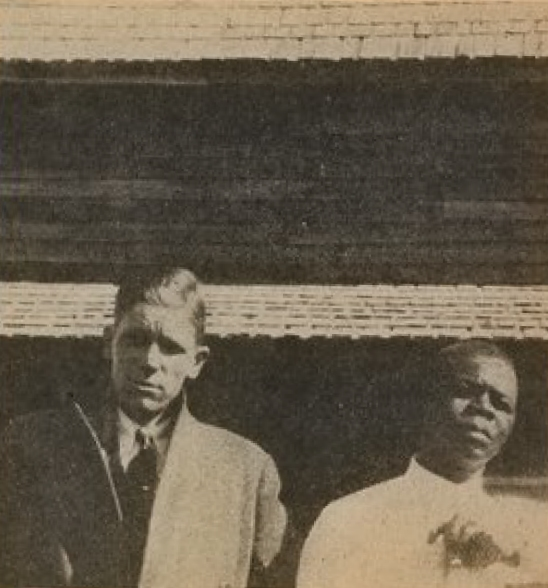
H. L. Mitchell (left), secretary of the Southern Tenant Farmers Union, and E. B. McKinney, vice-president

In 1934, Norman Thomas, persuaded Mitchell to start a racially integrated union for tenant farmers. This was the Southern Tenant Farmers Union. (Thomas worked to organize sharecroppers in the South, and occasionally suffered beatings and arrests in the process.) The union came into existence in July 1934, when a group of tenant farmers in the Arkansas Delta prevailed on local businessmen Mitchell and East to help them start a union. Some ten whites, including Mitchell and East, and seven Blacks, participated in the organizing meeting. Isaac (Ike) Shaw led the Blacks. Shaw had been a member of the Progressive Farmers and Household Union of America, whose members had been massacred in Elaine, Arkansas in 1919. Mitchell referred to that violence during this founding meeting, when he said: "This time it is going to be different. We white men are going to be in the front, and when the shooting starts, we will be the first to go down." The group elected East as president and Mitchell as secretary.

Mitchell subsequently sent word out to socialists all over the south, asking them to come and help organize. In 1934, The New Leader published Mitchell's national appeal: "Socialists and trade unionists in the southern states, especially in rural communities, are asked to communicate with H. O. Mitchell, Tyronza, Ark., regarding the possibility of forming local branches of the Southern Tenant Farmers' Union."

Later he hired the union's first attorney, C. T. Carpenter to get a Black preacher, one of the union's original members, C. H. Smith, out of jail; Smith had been arrested on his way to a church to organize for the union when he was set on by a mob including law enforcement, arrested, and beaten in jail. Mitchell had written to the American Civil Liberties Union to find a lawyer for Smith, but without success, before hiring Carpenter.

Mitchell's byline began to appear in print in respected long-standing national periodicals, with a letter to The New Republic (1934) and an article in The Nation (1935). The letter in The New Republic emphasized the importance of a racially integrated stand against the exploitation and violence offered by the plantation owners. The piece in The Nation described some of the organized persecution suffered by the STFU, including evictions, violence, and the suppression of a muckraking Agricultural Adjustment Administration report roundly criticizing that agency. The Nation also published correspondence from him in 1936.

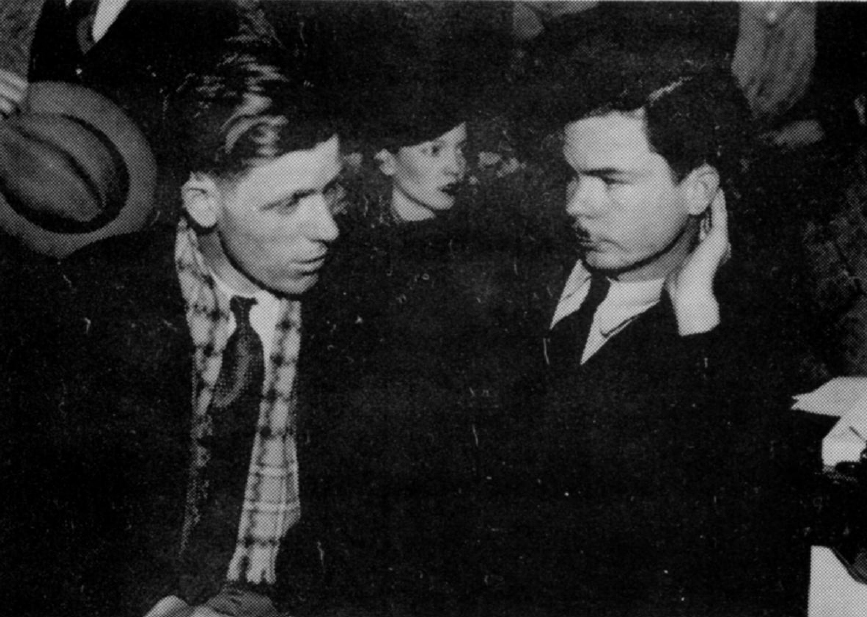
H. L. Mitchell (left) and STFU organizer Ward H. Rodgers at Rodgers' 1935 anarchy trial, Marked Tree, Arkansas

Mitchell was also writing telegrams. In late January 1935, the Federal Emergency Relief Administration instructor Ward H. Rodgers was convicted of anarchy in Marked Tree and sentenced to six months in jail. He'd been terminated by his local superior the day he was arrested, but only received the notice after his conviction. Mitchell's telegram to Eleanor Roosevelt, wife of President Roosevelt, appeared in the Chicago Daily Tribune, outlining the circumstances. It concluded: ""Local political influence in having him fired evident. Sharecroppers and others have petitioned he be returned. Can you help?" He also telegrammed local authorities, according to a February 1935 Associated Press report in the Washington Post; he demanded that Arkansas Governor Futrell provide "necessary steps for our protection," after four students from Commonwealth College in Mena, Arkansas, responding to his telegram requesting help, were set on by a mob as they neared a meeting site, and were escorted by police out of the county.

By December, Commonwealth College was offering scholarships to the STFU "to prepare young sharecroppers for their immediate struggles." Mitchell was to select the students to be awarded the scholarships.

At the beginning of 1936, the St. Louis Post-Dispatch reported Mitchell's plan to contest the eviction of Arkansas tenants and sharecroppers prior to the distribution of government funds due on January 16. Later in 1936, the St. Louis Post-Dispatch gave front page coverage to a brief Associated Press report of Mitchell's statement concerning the shooting of two Black STFU members, and the arrest of a third, in connection with a meeting protesting the "wholesale eviction" of union members and their consequent desperate circumstances. (The paper followed up nine days later with extensive reporting on the STFU: a two column headline at the top of the front page, with the story continued in two columns inside. The article mentioned Mitchell at its end.

Meanwhile, Mitchell was organizing and planning. The Atlanta Constitution carried an Associated Press story at the beginning of 1936 in which Mitchell announced that the focus of an STFU gathering in Little Rock, Arkansas would be "the working out of new methods of extending the organization through an appropriate program for all sections." The meeting urged adoption of a national homestead law, which Mitchell described as "insuring land for the landless and possession of land to individual farmers... and [that] cooperative organizations of working farmers can operate large scale tracts with modern and improved farming methods."

The racially integrated nature of the STFU, and its support for Black tenant farmers (including calling for universal suffrage and an end to the poll tax), gave Mitchell himself some notice in the Black press, for instance in Associated Negro Press articles in The Modern Farmer, the publication of the National Federation of Colored Farmers. The Christian Science Monitor, reporting national reaction in its story of the Supreme Court's voiding the Agricultural Adjustment Act, quoted Mitchell that the STFU did not regret the Court's decision, along with his explanation: "it brought nothing but increased hardship to the sharecropper and tenant." The Washington Post picked up the story the next day in a column of various national news.

In June, the St. Louis Post-Dispatch reported that Mitchell, accompanied by two officials of the National Committee on Rural Social Planning, Gardner Jackson and John P. Davis, met with Senate Majority Leader Joe Robinson, Democrat of Arkansas. The delegation described the violent abrogation of rural workers' civil rights across Arkansas and the south. Per Jackson, Robinson agreed to promote investigations by both the Arkansas and U. S. Departments of Labor. Mitchell himself describes this meeting in more colorful terms: "My temper flared [after Robinson suggested Mitchell was a foreign agent]. 'Let me tell you something, Senator! I lived in Arkansas for seven years till your God damned friends in Poinsett County decided to lynch me.'"

=== Last years ===
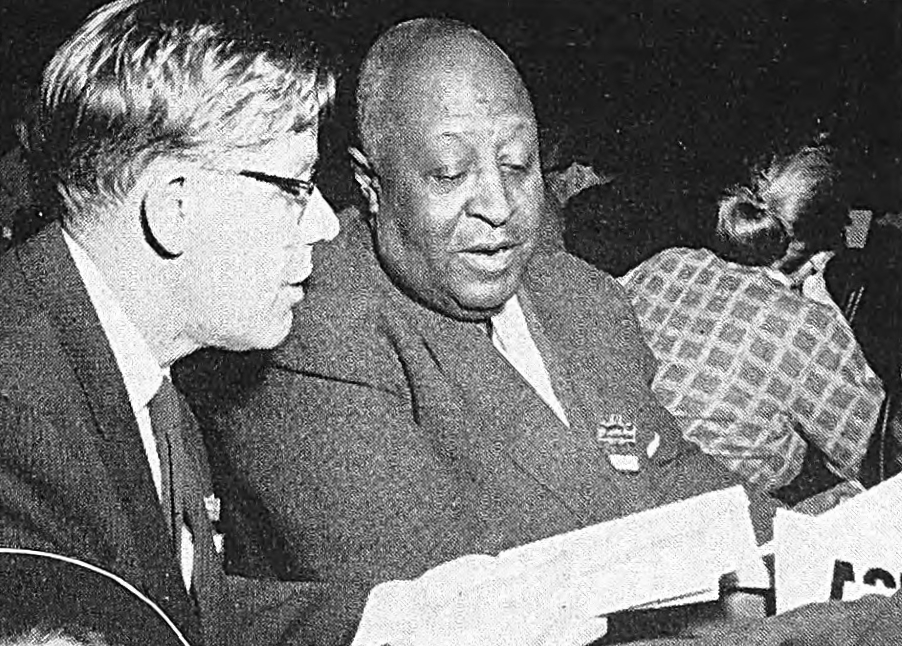
Mitchell and Milton P. Webster at the AFL-CIO's second annual convention, December 1957

The year before Mitchell's death, he continued to promote the legacy of the STFU, with a free first showing of the documentary film Our Land Too: The Legacy of the Southern Tenant Farmers Union, in what was then his home town, Montgomery, Alabama. A post-showing discussion included Wayne Flynt, then chairman of the Auburn University history department, and two other distinguished specialists: William Lawson, chairman of the sociology department at Alabama State University, and Ed Bridges, head of the Alabama Department of Archives and History. Three other former STFU members (besides Mitchell) also participated, including John Handcox and Mitchell's wife, Dorothy Dowe Mitchell. Mitchell hoped to distribute the film (and microfilms of STFU documents) to schools and libraries by purchase or rental, and he had worked up a list of 83 such institutions. He also toured with the film, including a free showing, followed by participation in a discussion, under the auspices of the Workers Defense League in New York City.

== Influence ==
Cesar Chavez's first union card was from the National Farm Labor Union, when Mitchell was its president.

Wade Rathke, the founder of the Association of Community Organizations for Reform Now (ACORN), had studied the STFU, and described finding Mitchell in 1973. Rathke wrote of a lesson from Mitchell in a later email: "STFU died because of its inability to collect dues. Believe me, I never forgot that." Elsewhere, Rathke quotes a passage from Mitchell's son Samuel's book about H. L., where Samuel writes: "Philosophically, Mitch’s most important heir is the Action <sic> for Community Organizing Now (ACORN). Mitchell addressed its convention in Memphis on December 8, 1978." Rathke, who kept a painting of Mitchell in his office, described Mitchell as "my old friend and colleague."

The Mitchell-East Building in Tyronza, Arkansas, was the former dry-cleaning store of H. L. Mitchell and the service station of Clay East. It served as the STFU's original headquarters. As of 2010, the building was the home of the Southern Tenant Farmers Museum and was a contributing property in the National Register of Historic Places-listed Tyronza Commercial Historic District.

== Family ==
Mitchell's son, Samuel Howard Mitchell, was a sociologist and professor at the University of Chicago and then at the University of Calgary. He worked and wrote primarily on education-related topics but he also wrote a book about his father, A Leader Among Sharecroppers, Migrants, and Farm Workers: H.L. Mitchell and friends.

== Writings ==
- Mitchell, H. L. (1979). Mean things happening in this land : the life and times of H. L. Mitchell, co-founder of the Southern Tenant Farmers Union. Allanheld, Osmun. ISBN 9780916672256. OCLC 5103152.
- Mitchell, H. L. (1987). Roll the union on: a pictorial history of the Southern Tenant Farmers' Union. Chicago: Charles H. Kerr Publishing Company. ISBN 088286159X. OCLC 19222041.
- Mitchell, H. L. (1973). "The founding and early history of the Southern Tenant Farmers' Union". The Arkansas Historical Quarterly. 32 (4). Conway, Arkansas: Arkansas Historical Association: 342–369. doi:10.2307/40027642. JSTOR 40027642. OCLC 812577. Reprinted from The Arkansas Historical Quarterly, 32, 4, pp. 342–269
- Mitchell, H. L. (1972–73). Oral history [of the Southern Tenant Farmers' Union]. Montgomery, Alabama: Southern Rural Welfare Association. OCLC 812579. Lectures by and interviews of H. L. Mitchell
- Mitchell, H. L. (1968). The Southern Tenant Farmer's Union. Nashville: Southern Student Organizing Committee. OCLC 9015098. Originally an article in The New South Student, April 1968
- Mitchell, H. L. (1966). American People's Movements: The Southern Tenant Farmer's Union, 1966. Oxford, Mississippi: University of Mississippi Libraries. OCLC 773303665. Edited from tape recordings made by H. L. Mitchell
