= Tyronza Methodist Episcopal Church, South =

Historic church in Arkansas, United States

- U.S. National Register of Historic Places
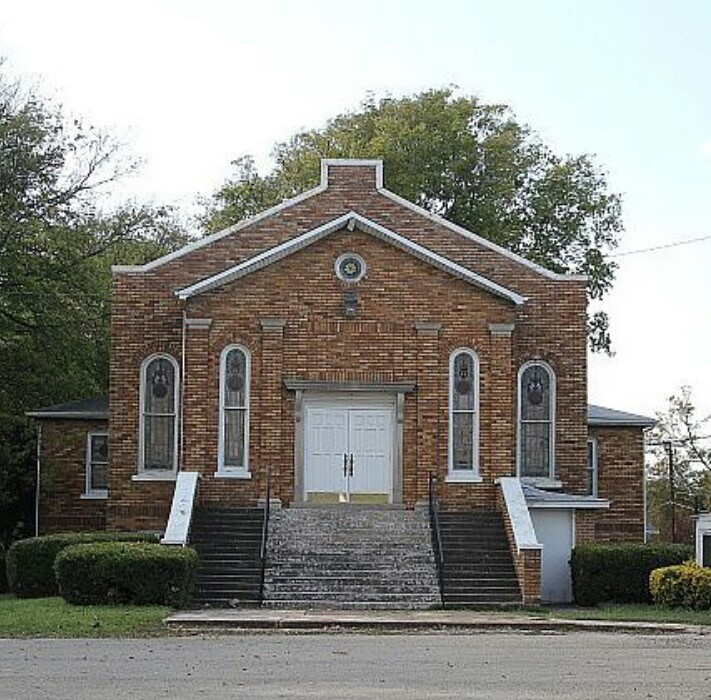

- Location within Arkansas Location within the United States
- Location: 129 Church St. Tyronza, Arkansas
- Coordinates: 35°29′24″N 90°21′35″W
- Area: less than one acre
- Architectural style: Classical Revival
- NRHP reference No.: 15000260
- Added to NRHP: May 26, 2015

The Tyronza Methodist Episcopal Church, South is a historic church building at 129 Church Street in Tyronza, Arkansas. It is a single-story masonry structure, built out of orange brick laid on a raised basement. Its main facade, facing west, has a projecting vestibule with a shallow-pitch roofline matching that of the main roof, and is approached by a broad and shallow flight of stairs. Windows on this facade are narrow, with rounded-arch tops, while other windows on the building are either arched or rectangular sash. The church was built in 1928, and is a good local example of Classical Revival design. Its architect is unknown; its design resembles that of the Wabbaseka Methodist Episcopal Church, South.

The church was listed on the National Register of Historic Places in 2015. The congregation was closed by the United Methodist Church in 2012.

== See also ==
- National Register of Historic Places listings in Poinsett County, Arkansas
