= Susan D. Carle =

American legal scholar and professor

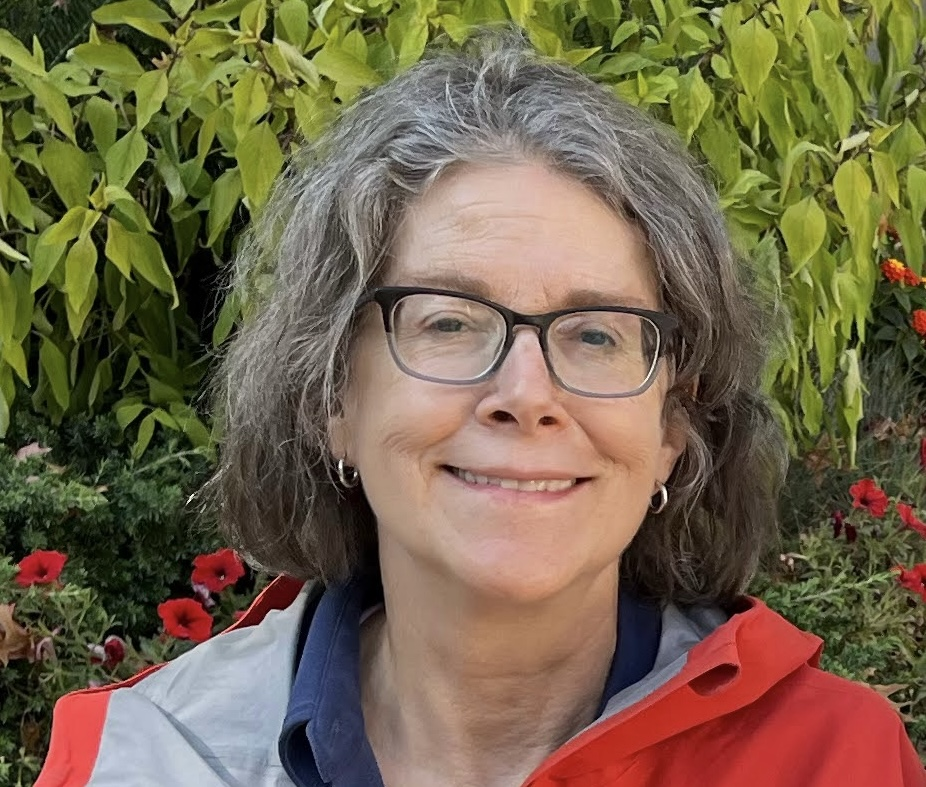
Carle in 2024

Susan D. Carle is an American legal scholar and professor at American University Washington College of Law. Her work focuses on civil rights legal history, constitutional law, employment discrimination, legal ethics, and the history and sociology of the legal profession. She is the recipient of the Liberty Legacy Foundation Award.

== Education and early career ==
Susan Carle was born in Bangladesh and grew up in Romania, Australia, and Turkey as the child of a foreign service officer. She then returned to the U.S. and earned her Bachelor of Arts degree in sociology and anthropology, magna cum laude, from Bryn Mawr College. She received her Juris Doctor from Yale Law School, where she served as an editor of The Yale Law Journal and a member of the Prison Legal Service clinic.

Following her graduation from Yale Law School, Carle clerked for Delores K. Sloviter on the United States Court of Appeals for the Third Circuit in Philadelphia. She then joined the Civil Rights Division of the U.S. Department of Justice as an appellate attorney, and later worked at the union-side labor and employment law firm Bredhoff & Kaiser. She was the W.M. Keck Fellow in Legal Ethics at Georgetown University Law Center.

== Academic career ==
Carle then joined the faculty of the American University Washington College of Law, where she is now Professor of Law. She has held several leadership roles within the law school, serving as Associate Dean for Scholarship and Vice Dean.

Carle has held visiting appointments at Harvard Law School and Washington and Lee University School of Law. Earlier in her career, she served as the W.M. Keck Fellow in Legal Ethics at Georgetown University Law Center.

She has served as chair of the American Association of Law Schools Section on Professional Responsibility and its Professional Development Committee, a member of a Federal Advisory Committee Act Commission dedicated to the history of African American women activists, and a longstanding member of the legal ethics advisory committee of the National Disability Rights Network. She also serves as vice chair of the Board of the Government Accountability Project.

== Major works ==
Her work examines how lawyers have historically conceived their professional obligations in advancing social justice and how social movements have shaped both legal doctrines and professional norms.

Her second book, Defining the Struggle: National Organizing for Racial Justice, 1880–1915 (Oxford University Press, 2013; paperback edition, 2016), chronicles the early efforts to establish a national framework for civil rights activism in the United States. The book received the Liberty Legacy Award from the Organization of American Historians for outstanding scholarship on the civil rights struggle. She is also the creator of Lawyers’ Ethics and the Pursuit of Social Justice: A Critical Reader (NYU Press, 2005), a which defined a newly emerging field of critical legal ethics scholarship.

Her earlier publications include influential essays such as “Race, Class, and Legal Ethics in the Early NAACP,” which won the Association of American Law Schools’ Best Scholarly Paper.

== Selected publications ==
=== Books ===
- Carle, Susan D. (2013-10-31). Defining the Struggle. Oxford University Press. ISBN 978-0-19-994574-0.
- Carle, Susan D., ed. (2005). Lawyers' ethics and the pursuit of social justice: a critical reader. Critical America. New York: New York University Press. ISBN 978-0-8147-1640-3.

=== Journals ===
- Carle, Susan (2025-03-01). "Social Movement Lawyering and Due Process Values". Fordham Law Review. 93 (4): 1141.
- Carle, Susan (2025-01-30). "Liquidation and the Fourteenth Amendment". Florida Law Review. 76 (1): 103. ISSN 1045-4241.
- Carle, Susan (2024-01-01). "Justice William J. Brennan Jr.'s Teleological Jurisprudence and What it Means for Constitutional Interpretation Today". University of Richmond Law Review. 58: 227–283.
- Carle, Susan D. (2024). "The Failed Idea of Judicial Restraint: A Brief Intellectual History". Law & Social Inquiry. 49 (1): 569–592. doi:10.1017/lsi.2023.66. ISSN 0897-6546.
- Carle, Susan (2023-05-30). "Reconstruction's Lessons". Columbia Journal of Race and Law. 13 (1): 734–789. doi:10.52214/cjrl.v13i1.11662. ISSN 2155-2401.
- Carle, Susan (2011-10-01). "How Myth-Busting about the Historical Goals of Civil Rights Activism Can Illuminate Paths for the Future". Stanford Journal of Civil Rights & Civil Liberties: 167–195.
- Carle, Susan (2013-02-08). "A Social Movement History of Title VII Disparate Impact Analysis". Florida Law Review. 63 (1): 251. ISSN 1045-4241.
- Carle, Susan (2009-01-01). "Debunking the Myth of Civil Rights Liberalism: Visions of Racial Justice in the Thought of T. Thomas Fortune, 1880-1890". Articles in Law Reviews & Other Academic Journals.
