= Modern Farmer =

Modern Farmer may refer to:

- Modern Farmer (magazine), an American magazine
- Modern Farmer (TV series), a 2014 Korean TV series
- The Modern Farmer, an African American agricultural publication
