= John Handcox =

American poet

John L. Handcox
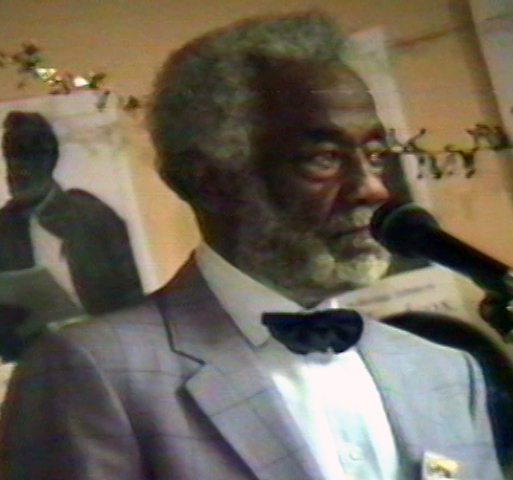
- Poet and musician John Handcox at a Union Labor Tribute, San Diego, 1992
- Born: February 05, 1904; Brinkley, Arkansas, US
- Died: September 18, 1992 (aged 88); San Diego, California, US
- Occupations: Poet, songwriter
- Spouse: Ruth

John L. Handcox (1904–1992) was a Great Depression-era tenant farmer and union advocate from Arkansas known for his politically charged songs and poetry. Handcox is noted for playing a "vital role in bettering the lives of sharecroppers and energizing labor union organizers and members." Despite his brief career, many of his songs were so popular that they became standard folk songs themselves, and continue to be sung today.

== Biography ==
Handcox was born February 5, 1904, in Brinkley, Arkansas. As a child he admired the poetry of Paul Laurence Dunbar, although he only attended school to the ninth grade. Handcox's father was a landowner, but they lost their property when he was crushed by a wagon. In 1935, Handcox joined the Southern Tenant Farmers Union and began writing songs and poetry to rally the group's members. Two years later, Charles Seeger and Sidney Robertson recorded him for the Library of Congress. His songs were later promoted by fellow protest songsters, Pete Seeger, Woody Guthrie, and Joe Glazer. After disappearing from the public eye for almost forty years, Handcox emerged in the 1980s for the 50th anniversary celebration of the STFU in Memphis. In 1984, he composed two songs criticizing the presidency of Ronald Reagan.

Poet and musician John Handcox was honored at a Tribute in San Diego in 1992.

On January 31, 1992, Handcox was honored at a Tribute at the City Heights, San Diego Labor Council headquarters. Musicians Pete Seeger and Joe Glazer accompanied Handcox in performing "Roll the Union On."

In November 2013 Michael Honey, a professor at the University of Washington Tacoma published a biography of Handcox's life, titled Sharecropper's Troubador: John L. Handcox, the Southern Tenant Farmer's Union, and the African American Song Tradition. Honey was introduced to Handcox by Pete Seeger in 1985 and he recorded and interviewed him at the Library of Congress that same year.

Two of Handcox's songs are used as the titles of books by the co-founder of the Southern Tenant Farmers Union, H. L. Mitchell: Mitchell's autobiography, Mean Things Happening In This Land (which includes three of Handcox's song lyrics in an appendix), and Roll the Union On: A Pictorial History of the Southern Tenant Farmers' Union.

== Recordings ==
John L. Handcox: Songs, Poems & Stories of the Southern Tenant Farmers Union (West Virginia University Sound Archive, 2004)

- "Raggedy, Raggedy Are We"
- "No More Mourning"
- "Mean Things"
- "Planter and The Sharecropper"
- "Landlord, What In the Heaven Is The Matter With You?"
- "In My Heart"
- "Join The Union Tonight"
- "Roll The Union On"
- "Strike In Arkansas"
- "Oh No, We Don't Want Reagan Anymore"
- "Let's Get Reagan Out"
- "I Live On"
- Interview with Joe Glazer recorded at the Library of Congress in 1985

Songs for Political Action: Folk Music, Topical Songs and the American Left (Bear Family Records, 1996)

- "Raggedy, Raggedy Are We"
- "No More Mourning"
- "Join The Union Tonight"
- "There Is Mean Things Happening in this Land"

== Books about John Handcox ==
- John Marsh (editor). You Work Tomorrow: An Anthology of American Labor Poetry, 1929-41. Ann Arbor, Michigan: University of Michigan Press, 2007. ISBN 978-0-472-05000-0. (Contains John Handcox poems "The Planter and the Sharecropper", "Landlord, What in the Heaven is the Matter with You?", and "The Union Song.")
- Michael Honey. Sharecropper's Troubadour: John L. Handcox, the Southern Tenant Farmers' Union, and the African American Song Tradition. New York: Palgrave Macmillan, 2013. ISBN 9780230111271.
