= Lepanto Commercial Historic District =

Historic district in Arkansas, United States

- U.S. National Register of Historic Places
- U.S. Historic district
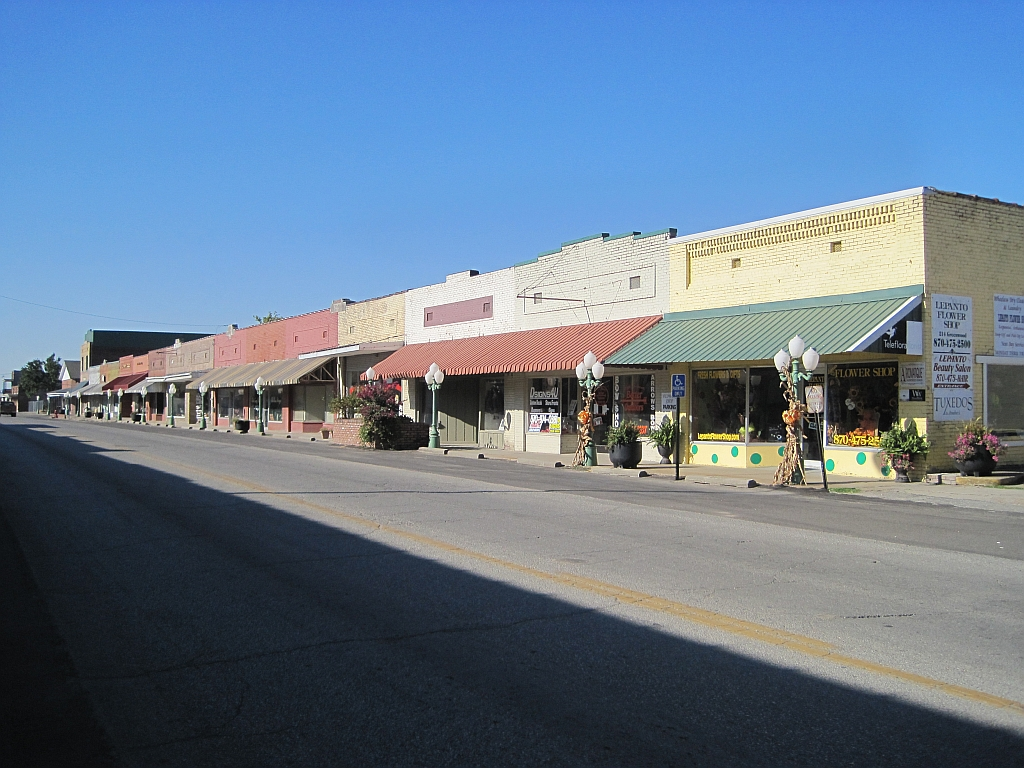

- Location within Arkansas Location within the United States
- Location: Roughly bounded by Holmes St., Little R., Dewey St. & Alexander Ave., Lepanto, Arkansas
- Coordinates: 35.611°N 90.330°W
- Area: 12 acres (4.9 ha)
- Built: 1915
- Built by: H.A. Lesmeiste (Lepanto Police Department)
- Architect: Rev. Leslie Riherd (Lepanto School Auditorium and Gymnasium)
- Architectural style: Early Commercial, Art Deco
- NRHP reference No.: 09000743
- Added to NRHP: September 21, 2009

The Lepanto Commercial Historic District encompasses the traditional commercial heart of the small city of Lepanto, Arkansas. The district includes one block of Greenwood Avenue between Berry and Holmes Streets, and portions of two more blocks at either end, as well as two blocks of Berry Street, with a few buildings on adjacent streets. Lepanto was founded in 1903, but its surviving commercial architecture only dates as far back as c. 1915, when the Portis Company cotton gin was built at the eastern end of the district. Other early buildings include the triangular c. 1920 Arlington Light and Power building at 320 Greenwood, and the unusual Barton's of Lepanto building at 111 Berny Street, built as a wood frame lumber yard office c. 1920; its walls were bricked in 1955 when it was converted to a hardware store.

The district was listed on the National Register of Historic Places in 2009.

== See also ==
- National Register of Historic Places listings in Poinsett County, Arkansas
