= Marked Tree Commercial Historic District =

Historic district in Arkansas, United States

- U.S. National Register of Historic Places
- U.S. Historic district
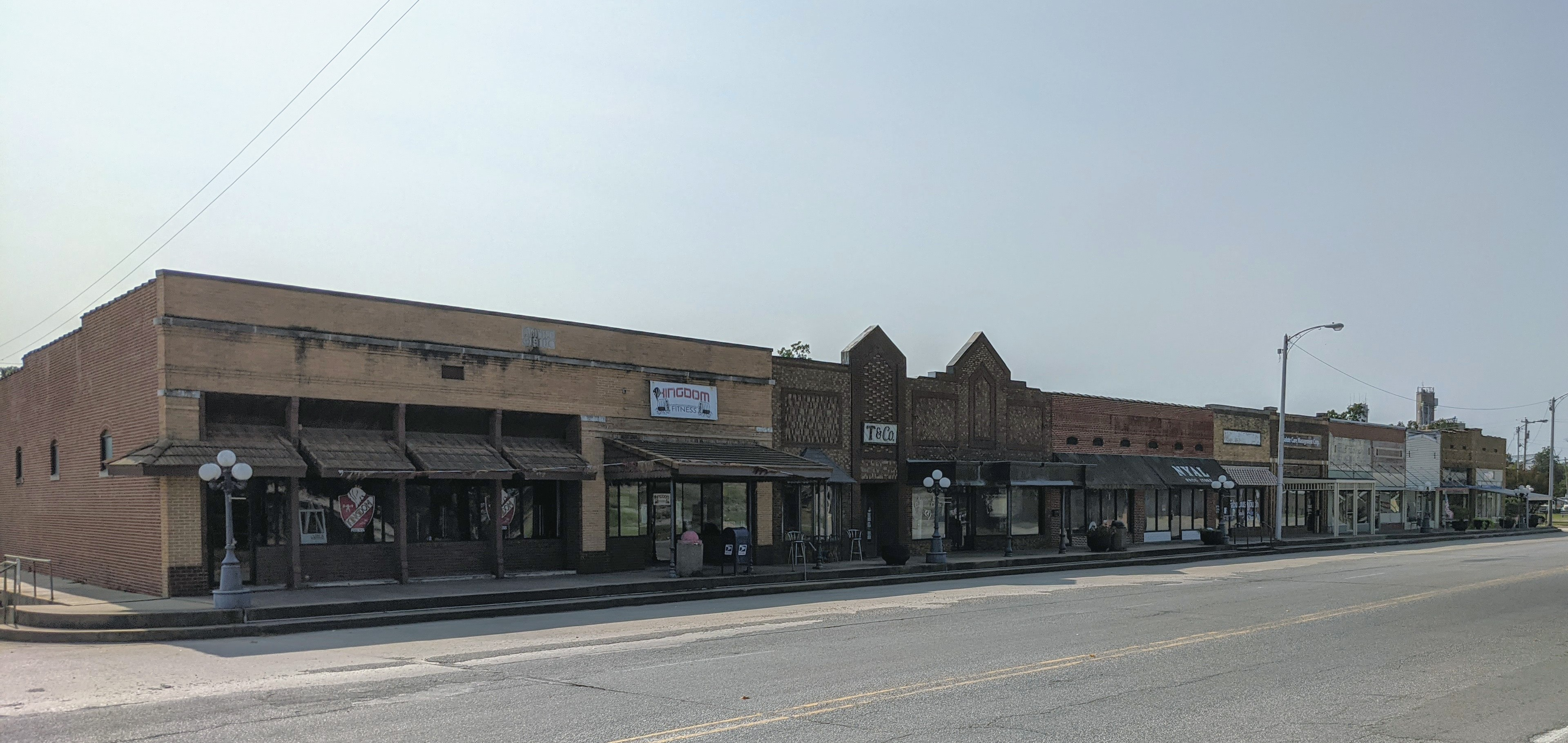

- Location within Arkansas Location within the United States
- Location: Elm St. between Liberty & Frisco Sts.; Frisco St. between Elm and Nathan Sts., Marked Tree, Arkansas
- Coordinates: 35.53283°N 90.42281°W
- Area: 4 acres (1.6 ha)
- Built: 1910
- Architectural style: Early Commercial, Classical Revival
- NRHP reference No.: 09000735
- Added to NRHP: September 18, 2009

The Marked Tree Commercial Historic District encompasses the historic commercial center of Marked Tree, Arkansas. It includes one city block of Frisco Street, between Nathan and Elm Streets, as well as two adjoining buildings on Elm Street. This area was developed commercially beginning with the arrival of the railroad in the 1880s, and was focused around the railroad depot, which no longer stands. All of the fifteen buildings in the district were built between 1910 and 1937, and exhibit typical early 20th-century commercial architecture, mostly executed in brick.

The district was listed on the National Register of Historic Places in 2009.

== See also ==
- National Register of Historic Places listings in Poinsett County, Arkansas
