= Poinsett County Courthouse =

- U.S. National Register of Historic Places
- U.S. Historic district – Contributing property
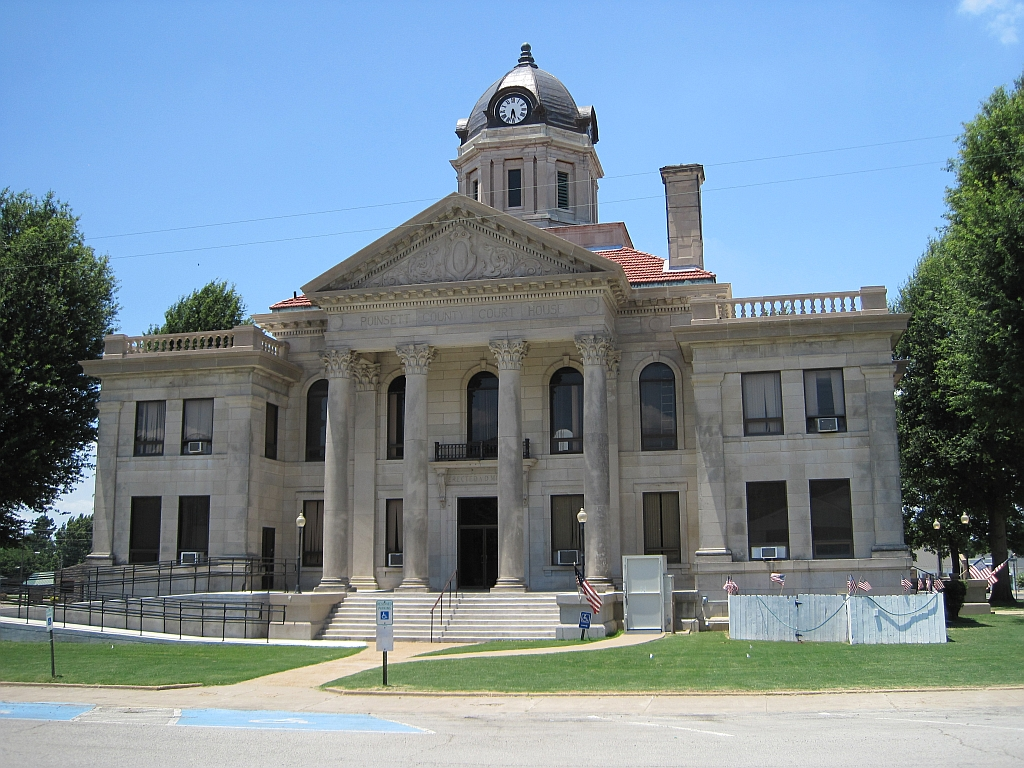

- Location within Arkansas Location within the United States
- Location: Bounded by Market, East, Court, and Main Sts., Harrisburg, Arkansas
- Coordinates: 35°33′47″N 90°43′2″W
- Area: less than one acre
- Built: 1918
- Architect: Selligman, Mitchell; Hollingsworth, J.E.
- Architectural style: Classical Revival
- Part of: Harrisburg Commercial Historic District (ID09000736)
- NRHP reference No.: 89001876

Significant dates
- Added to NRHP: November 3, 1989
- Designated CP: September 18, 2009

The Poinsett County Courthouse is located on a city block of downtown Harrisburg, Arkansas, bounded by Court, North Main, Market, and East Streets. It is a two-story granite and concrete structure, set on a raised foundation. The central block is topped by a tiled hip roof, with an octagonal tower set on a square base at its center. The front facade has a Classical Revival tetrastyle Corinthian portico with a fully enclosed gable pediment. Wings on either side of the main block are lower in height, but project beyond the main block's front and back. They are capped by low balustrade surrounding a flat roof. The courthouse was designed by Mitchell Seligman of Pine Bluff. Construction began in 1918 and it was completed in 1920. This courthouse was built to replace an earlier courthouse which had been destroyed by fire on May 4, 1917.

The building was listed on the National Register of Historic Places in 1989.

This courthouse continues to be used for County government offices. The Poinsett County website can be found at www.poinsettcounty.us

== See also ==
- National Register of Historic Places listings in Poinsett County, Arkansas
