= Ula Taylor =

Scholar and author

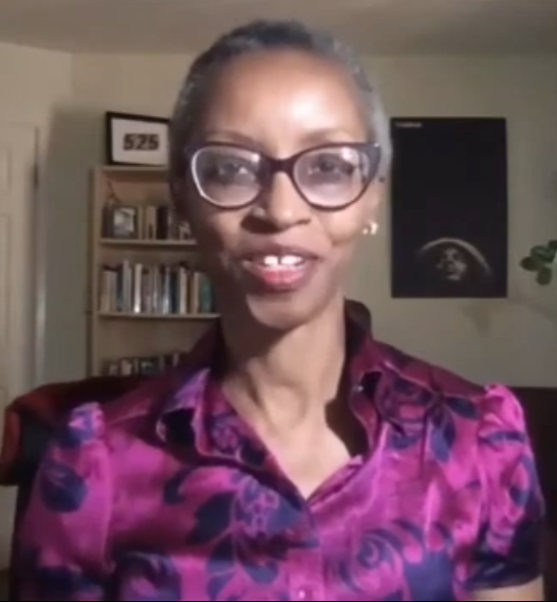

Academic background
- Education: University of California, Santa Barbara
- Thesis: Black women and political activism : Amy Jacques Garvey (1987)

Ula Yvette Taylor is a professor at the University of California, Berkeley. She is known for her work on African-American history and Diaspora studies.

== Education and career ==
She earned her doctorate in American History from University of California, Santa Barbara.

== Works ==
Her research specializations include African American History (1890–1980), Black nationalism, pan-Africanism, Black feminist theory, African American women's history, and civil rights and Black power. She is also known for her research with original archival documents.

Taylor's books include the coauthored Panther: A Pictorial History of the Black Panthers and the Story Behind the Film (Newmarket Press, 1995). Her second book was the biography The Veiled Garvey: The Life and Times of Amy Jacques Garvey written and published in North Carolina by the University of North Carolina Press in August, 2002.

In 2017, she wrote The Promise of Patriarchy: Women and the Nation of Islam (University of North Carolina Press, 2017). The book examined the theme of womanhood into African-American Muslims through an examination of the Nation of Islam from 1930 till 1975. Written chronologically, Taylor's book follows the growth of the growth of the organization though telling the stories of several NOI Sisters and prominent leaders, including founder, Master W. D. Fard, Prophet Elijah Muhammad, and Malcolm X, among others. This book was the topic of a book forum in a 2019 issue of the Journal of Civil and Human Rights, where five writers examined her book and Taylor provided a response to the reviews.

== Selected publications ==
- Van Peebles Mario; Taylor, Ula Y.; Lewis, J. Tarika (1995). Panther: a pictorial history of the Black Panthers and the story behind the film. New York: Newmarket Press. ISBN 978-1-55704-227-9.
- Taylor, Ula Y. (1998). "Making Waves: The Theory and Practice of Black Feminism". The Black Scholar. 28 (2): 18–28. doi:10.1080/00064246.1998.11430912. ISSN 0006-4246.
- Taylor, Ula (1998). "The Historical Evolution of Black Feminist Theory and Praxis". Journal of Black Studies. 29 (2): 234–253. doi:10.1177/002193479802900206. ISSN 0021-9347.
- Taylor, Ula Yvette (2010). The veiled Garvey: the life & times of Amy Jacques Garvey. Chapel Hill: University of North Carolina Press. ISBN 978-0-8078-5386-3.
- Taylor, Ula Y. (2017). The promise of patriarchy: women and the Nation of Islam. Chapel Hill: The University of North Carolina Press. ISBN 978-1-4696-3392-3.

== Honors and awards ==
In 2018 Taylor's book, The Promise of Patriarchy, received the Liberty Legacy Foundation Award. In 2013, she received the Distinguished Professor Teaching Award for the University of California, Berkeley.
