= Modern News Building =

- U.S. National Register of Historic Places
- U.S. Historic district – Contributing property
- Modern News 2018
- Location within Arkansas Location within the United States
- Location: 216 N. Main St. Harrisburg, Arkansas
- Coordinates: 35°33′50″N 90°43′30″W
- Area: less than one acre
- Built: 1896
- Built by: L.D. Freeman, Sr.
- Part of: Harrisburg Commercial Historic District (ID09000736)
- NRHP reference No.: 76000447

Significant dates
- Added to NRHP: June 18, 1976
- Designated CP: September 18, 2009

Early Photograph of original facade.

The Modern News Building is a historic commercial building at 216 North Main Street in downtown Harrisburg, Arkansas. It is a single-story rectangular brick building, with a flat roof and simple styling. A tall front steps down toward the rear of the building, with the side walls capped in ceramic tile. The original building measured only 40 feet deep, in 1910 an addition of 15 feet was added, then as additional 20 feet was added in 1952. The facade is three bays wide, with a center entry flanked by recessed windows. The brick facade was changed from the original design in 1953 as an attempt to modernize the building. Included in the gallery of this article, are a couple photos showing the original facade. A canvas awning extends across the facade. The building was built in 1896 and is significant as the home of The Modern News, which has been Harrisburg's newspaper until 2018. An account in an 1896 Modern Newspaper, revealed the correct date of construction to be 1896, rather than the more commonly believed date of 1888. Prior to 1896, it is believed the newspaper was run from the courthouse. L.D. Freeman purchased the newspaper in Harrisburg and changed its name in 1888. Before Freeman bought the business, the newspaper was called The Arkansas Tribune, and it is unclear of what date that started, though it would have been around 1873. It is local folklore that the original printing press that was being replaced was too large and heavy to remove from the structure, so someone went under the building, dug a hole deep enough for the press to fit, cut the floor out from underneath it, and buried it, sealing it with a new concrete floor throughout. It is a great pride the people of Harrisburg, Arkansas have that we possess most all of the original prints of the Modern News Paper in their original binding. Poinsett County Historical Society has worked with the Poinsett County Library to document these fragile historical documents by use of a scanner to help digitize them, so they are more accessible to the public. The scans can be seen and studied at the local library just around the corner from the newspaper building. In addition to the collection of Modern Newspapers, several dozen original copies of The Arkansas Tribune from the 1870s are also still in existence. The building was sold in 2019 by an heir of the founders. The building is now used as an event venue operating under the same name. The space is used to host parties, weddings, gatherings, etc. This building remains a local landmark, despite the newspaper closing its doors.

The building was listed on the National Register of Historic Places in 1976.

Horse and Buggy outside of the Modern News Building

Logging in front of Modern News Building

Modern News Building Interior

== See also ==
- National Register of Historic Places listings in Poinsett County, Arkansas
