= Michael Honey =

American historian

- Born: 1947 (age 78–79)
- Education: Oakland University; Howard University; Northern Illinois University
- Occupation: Historian
- Employer: University of Washington Tacoma

Michael K. Honey (born 1947) is an American historian, Guggenheim Fellow, Emeritus Haley Professor of Humanities at the University of Washington Tacoma and a Fellow at the Harvard Radcliffe Institute. He is a scholar, commentator, filmmaker, and teacher of African-American, civil rights, and labor history and nonviolence studies.

== Early life and Activism ==
Honey became a follower of the teachings of Martin Luther King Jr. while attending high school in Michigan, and helped establish Students for a Democratic Society at Oakland University. During the Vietnam War, Honey registered as a conscientious objector, and in 1970 was granted alternate service in the form of working as an organizer for the Southern Conference Educational Fund. SCEF was a civil rights organization working against racism and repression, based out of Louisville, Kentucky.

In this role, Honey and his then wife Martha Allen became deeply involved in organizing around the Black Six trial in Louisville. Both were soon arrested by local police for "jury tampering" by sending out post cards pushing for the community to support the Black Six. During their time in jail, a fire was set within the building almost killing those locked into the cells. They both ended up winning their cases and were released. During this time the Federal Bureau of Investigation began tracking Honey, and he would eventually be placed onto the Security Index due to his left-wing and pro civil-rights beliefs.

Following Honey's time as an organizer for SCEF, he served as the Southern Director of the National Committee Against Repressive Legislation, based out of Memphis, Tennessee for six years. During this period Honey organized against police use of deadly force, and worked to help free Black Panther members from jail. With Martha Allen, Honey helped organize the Free Angela Davis and All Political Prisoners campaign throughout the South, and worked against repressive mass surveillance legislation pushed by the Nixon administration.

Honey is a graduate of Northern Illinois University (Ph.D.), Howard University (M.A.) and Oakland University (B.A.).

== Academic career ==
Honey studied Black History and the South at Howard University, Northern Illinois University, and the Freedom History Project at the University of Maryland led by the scholar Ira Berlin.

Honey taught at the University of Maryland, Wesleyan University, and the University of Puget Sound, before he became a founding faculty member of the University of Washington-Tacoma satellite campus in 1990. At UWT he launched labor and civil rights classes, oral history teaching, and spearheaded archival projects.

Honey served as the Harry Bridges Chair of Labor Studies for the University of Washington, and as President of the Labor and Working-Class History Association.

Honey is best known for his scholarly research on the history of the American civil rights activist Martin Luther King Jr., and on the labor history of the United States. In 2011 he was awarded a Guggenheim Fellowship, "on the basis of his prior achievement and exceptional promise", from a field of almost 3,000 applicants from the United States and Canada. He has also received research grants and fellowships from the American Council of Learned Societies, the National Endowment for the Humanities, the National Humanities Center, the Rockefeller Foundation's Bellagio Research and Conference Center, the Huntington Library, and the Stanford Humanities Center.

In 2008 his book Going Down Jericho Road: The Memphis Strike, Martin Luther King's Last Campaign won the Liberty Legacy Foundation Award, awarded annually for the best book written by a professional historian on the fights for civil rights in the United States anytime from 1776 to the present. It also received the Robert F. Kennedy Center for Justice and Human Rights 2011 Book award given annually to a novelist who "most faithfully and forcefully reflects Robert Kennedy's purposes - his concern for the poor and the powerless, his struggle for honest and even-handed justice, his conviction that a decent society must assure all young people a fair chance, and his faith that a free democracy can act to remedy disparities of power and opportunity."

His oral history of John Handcox, a Great Depression-era tenant farmer from Arkansas and advocate for the Southern Tenant Farmers Union, known for his political songs and poetry highlights the role of music in Black culture in labor organizing. More recently, Honey co-wrote a book with civil rights leader James Lawson and academic Kent Wong, Revolutionary Nonviolence: Organizing for Freedom (University of California Press, 2024).

Michael Honey has deposited many boxes of oral histories, primary research and teaching files available to the public at the library archives of the University of Washington, the University of North Carolina Chapel Hill, and the Tacoma Public Library.

== Selected works ==
- Southern Labor and Black Civil Rights: Organizing Memphis Workers (1993) ISBN 978-0-252-06305-3
- Black Workers Remember: An Oral History of Segregation, Unionism, and the Freedom Struggle (1999) ISBN 0-520-21774-8
- Going Down Jericho Road: The Memphis Strike, Martin Luther King's Last Campaign, W. W. Norton (2007) ISBN 978-0-393-33053-3
- All Labor Has Dignity (ed., 2011) ISBN 978-0-8070-8600-1, Martin Luther King's speeches on labor rights and economic justice, in the King Legacy Series of Beacon Press
- To the Promised Land: Martin Luther King and the Fight for Economic Justice, W. W. Norton (2018) ISBN 978-0-393-65126-3
- Revolutionary Nonviolence: Organizing for Freedom, with James M. Lawson and Kent Wong and a preface by Angela Davis (2022) ISBN 978-0-520-38784-3
- Love and Solidarity: James M. Lawson and Nonviolence in the Search for Workers Rights, Bullfrog Films (2014), Produced and directed with Errol Webber

== Archives ==
- Michael K. Honey Papers. 1935–2001. 8 cubic ft. (8 boxes).
