= Tyronza Commercial Historic District =

Historic district in Arkansas, United States

- U.S. National Register of Historic Places
- U.S. Historic district
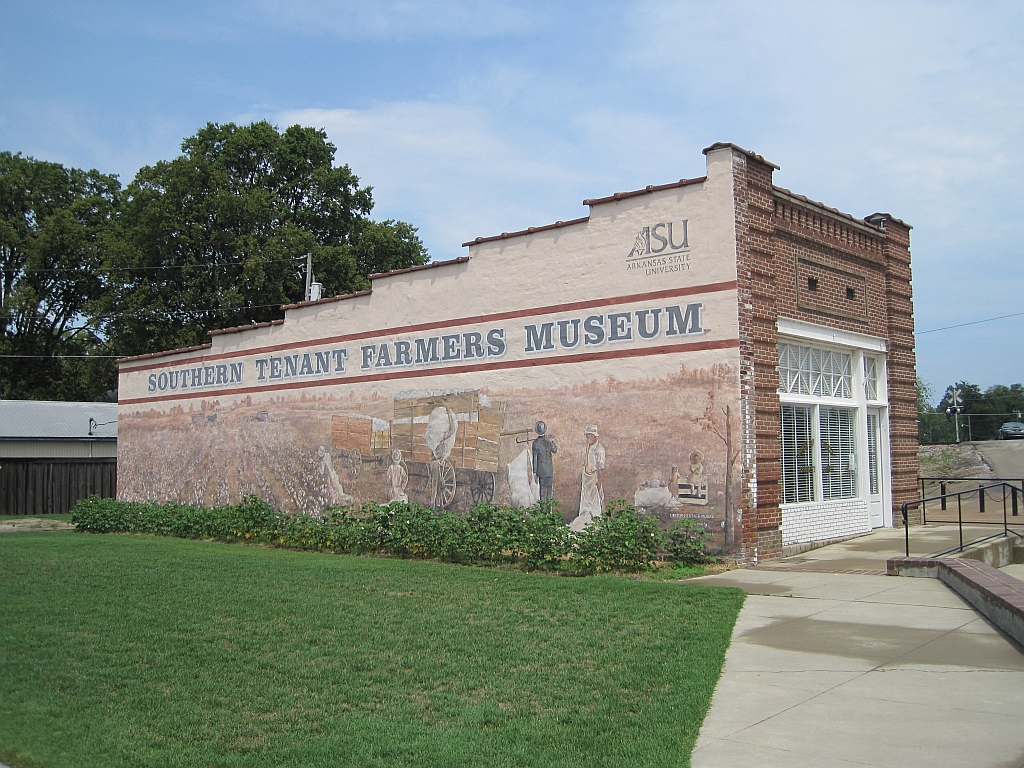

- Location within Arkansas Location within the United States
- Location: S. Main St. bounded on the north by Old U.S. Highway 63 and on the south by Mullins St., Tyronza, Arkansas
- Coordinates: 35.49049°N 90.35857°W
- Area: 8 acres (3.2 ha)
- Built: 1916
- NRHP reference No.: 09000896
- Added to NRHP: July 29, 2010

The Tyronza Commercial Historic District encompass much of the traditional commercial heart of the small city of Tyronza, Arkansas. It extends along the city's Main Street, southward from the railroad tracks for about three blocks, and includes 17 historically significant buildings, as well as Tyronza Park, a small city park. Most of the district's buildings were built between 1910 and 1930, the major period of Tyronza's growth, and are mostly typical commercial vernacular brick and masonry structures one and two stories in height. The oldest building in the district is the c. 1916 Bank of Tyronza building at 117 South Main. This building and a few others nearby now house a local history museum.

The district was listed on the National Register of Historic Places in 2010.

== See also ==
- National Register of Historic Places listings in Poinsett County, Arkansas
