= Harrisburg Commercial Historic District =

Historic district in Arkansas, United States

- U.S. National Register of Historic Places
- U.S. Historic district
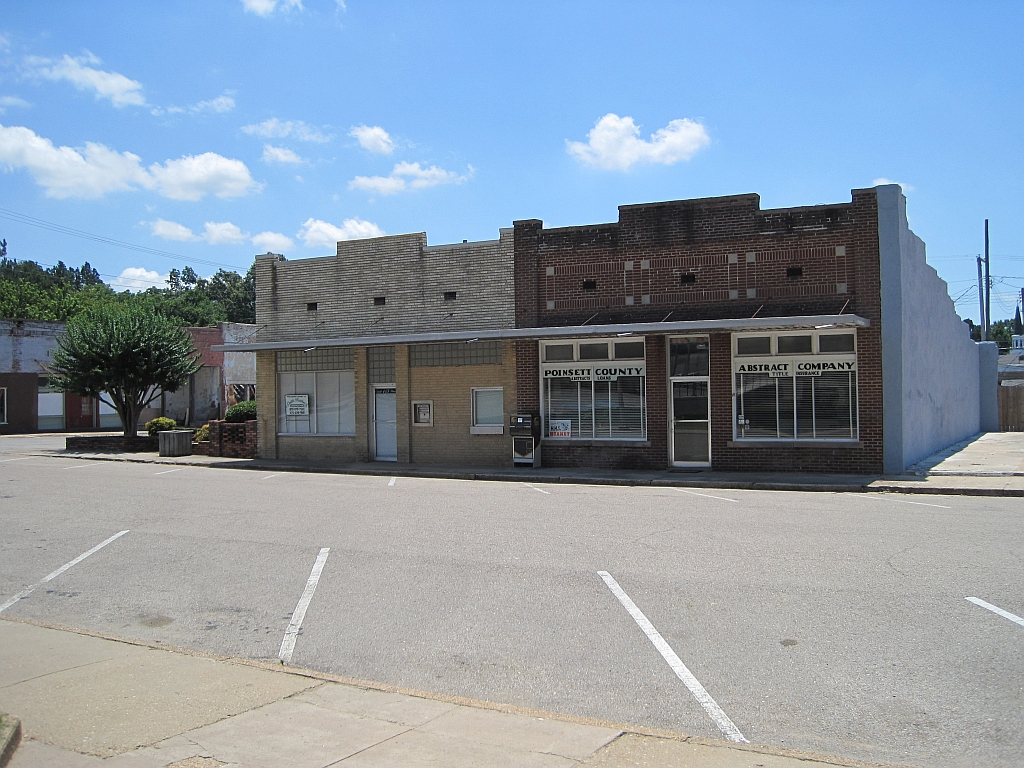

- Location within Arkansas Location within the United States
- Location: Roughly bounded by Jackson, Water, South & Gould Sts., Harrisburg, Arkansas
- Coordinates: 35.56305°N 90.71731°W
- Area: 8.8 acres (3.6 ha)
- Built: 1888
- Built by: multiple, including Stump Construction Co.
- Architect: multiple, including Stuck, Frier, Lane & Scott
- Architectural style: Early Commercial, Italianate, Classical Revival
- NRHP reference No.: 09000736
- Added to NRHP: September 18, 2009

The Harrisburg Commercial Historic District encompasses the historic civic and commercial heart of Harrisburg, Arkansas, the county seat of Poinsett County, located in the far northeastern part of the state. The district encompasses the buildings surrounding Court Square, where the Poinsett County Courthouse is located, and extends a short way north and south on Main and East Streets. Although Harrisburg was founded in 1856, its substantial growth did not begin until after the arrival of the railroad in the 1880s. The oldest building in the district is the Harrisburg State Bank building at 100 North Main. The courthouse is a grand Classical Revival structure built in 1917. Most of the district buildings were built before the Great Depression, using brick or masonry construction.

The district was listed on the National Register of Historic Places in 2009. Separately listed buildings in the district include the courthouse and the Modern News Building at 216 North Main.

== See also ==
- National Register of Historic Places listings in Poinsett County, Arkansas
