= Poinsett Community Club =

- U.S. National Register of Historic Places
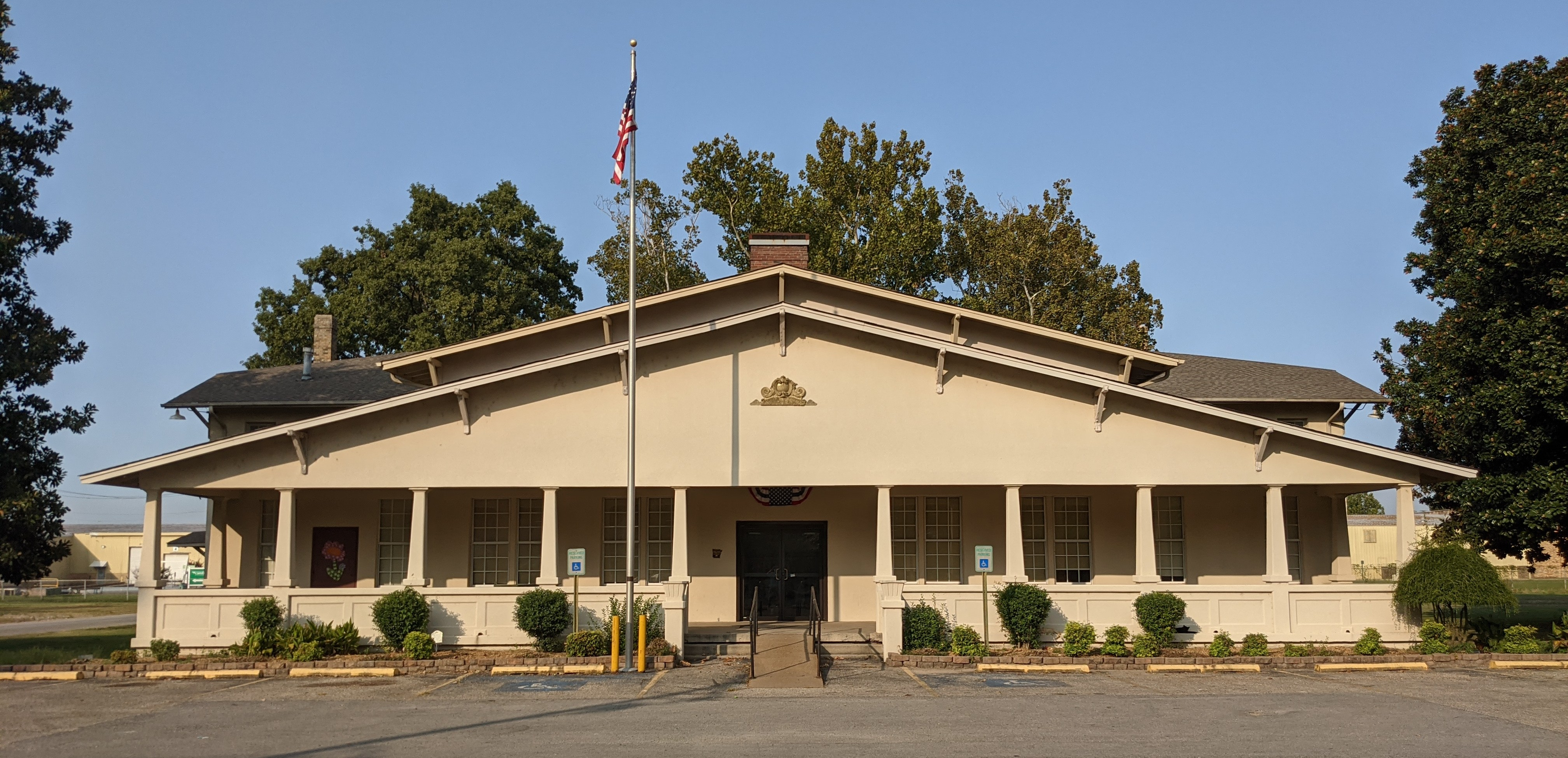
- Poinsett Community Club

- Location within Arkansas Location within the United States
- Location: Main & Poinsett Sts. Trumann, Arkansas
- Coordinates: 35.67259°N 90.51266°W
- Area: 2.2 acres (0.89 ha)
- Built: 1927
- Architect: Watson B. Boggs
- Architectural style: Bungalow/American Craftsman
- NRHP reference No.: 86002847
- Added to NRHP: October 9, 1986

The Poinsett Community Club is a historic community center at Main and Poinsett Streets in Trumann, Arkansas. This large American Craftsman/Bungalow structure was designed by Watson B. Boggs and built in 1927, to provide a number of social resources to the employees of the Poinsett Lumber Company. The building was designed to house a gymnasium that doubles as a performing venue, meeting and classroom facilities, and a library. It has for many years been a major social center of the small community, hosting events, theatrical performances, and refugees from the area's periodic floods.

The building was listed on the National Register of Historic Places in 1986.

== See also ==
- National Register of Historic Places listings in Poinsett County, Arkansas
