= Rivervale Inverted Siphons =

- U.S. National Register of Historic Places
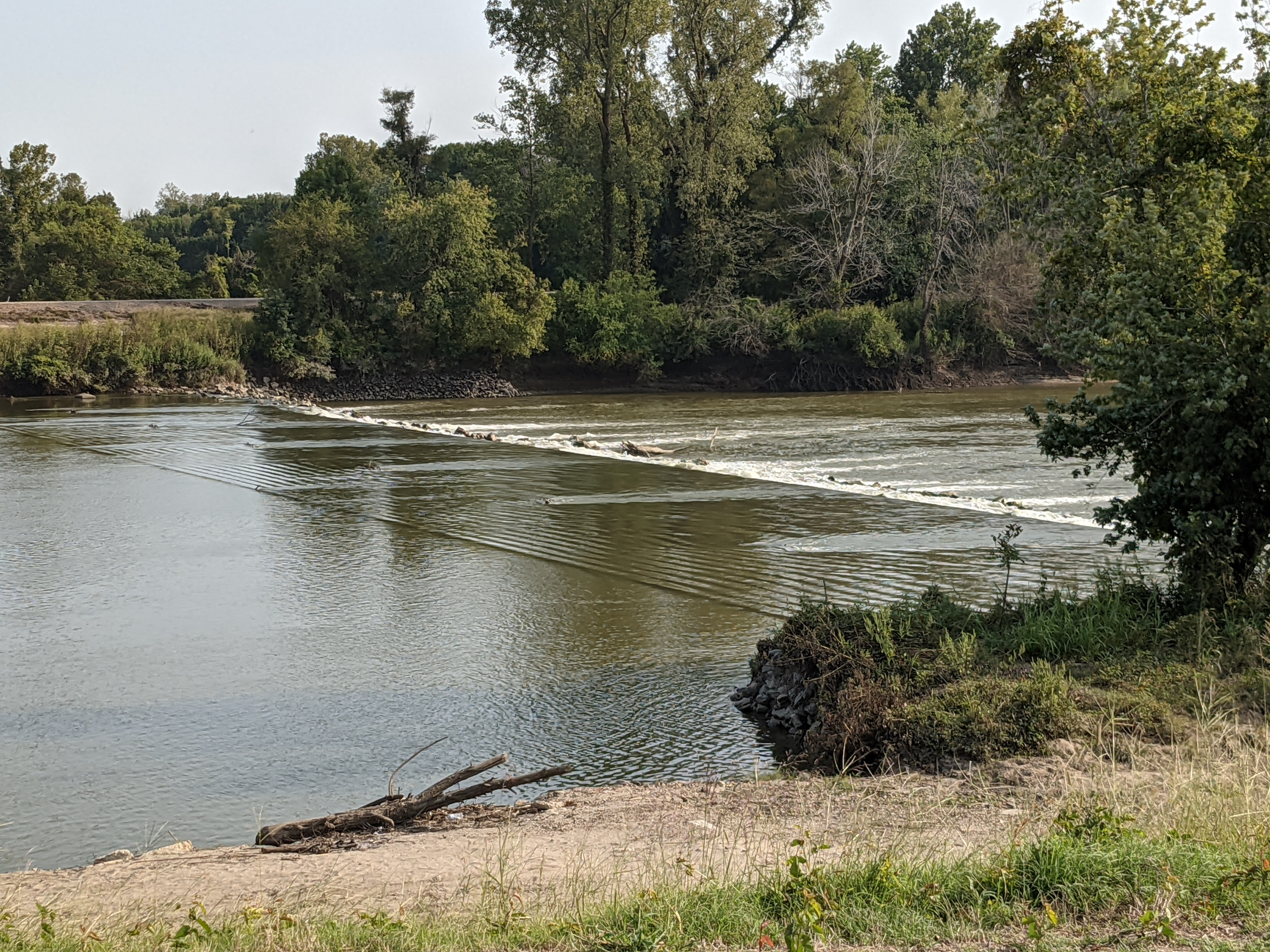

- Location within Arkansas Location within the United States
- Location: Just SW of AR 135 across Little R., Rivervale, Arkansas
- Coordinates: 35°40′19″N 90°20′21″W
- Area: 3 acres (1.2 ha)
- Built: 1926
- Architect: Pride & Fairley Engineering Co.; et al.
- Architectural style: Inverted drainage siphon
- NRHP reference No.: 91000339
- Added to NRHP: March 22, 1991

The Rivervale Inverted Siphons, also known as the Rivervale Tunnel, are a historic flood control project in rural Poinsett County, Arkansas. It is essentially a very large concrete culvert, which channels the water flow of Ditch Number 4 under the Right Hand Chute Little River, into which it would normally drain. It is located just off Arkansas Highway 135 in northeastern Poinsett County, near its junctions with County Roads 87 and 112. Built in 1924–26, the purpose of the culvert was to reduce the amount of water carried by the Right Hand Chute during major flooding events by diverting the volume of Ditch Number 4 further downstream. As part of a robust series of flood control works, it helped stabilize flood management in the area so that further economic development could take place.

The structure was listed on the National Register of Historic Places in 1991.

== See also ==
- National Register of Historic Places listings in Poinsett County, Arkansas
