= Marked Tree Lock and Siphons =

- U.S. National Register of Historic Places
- U.S. Historic district
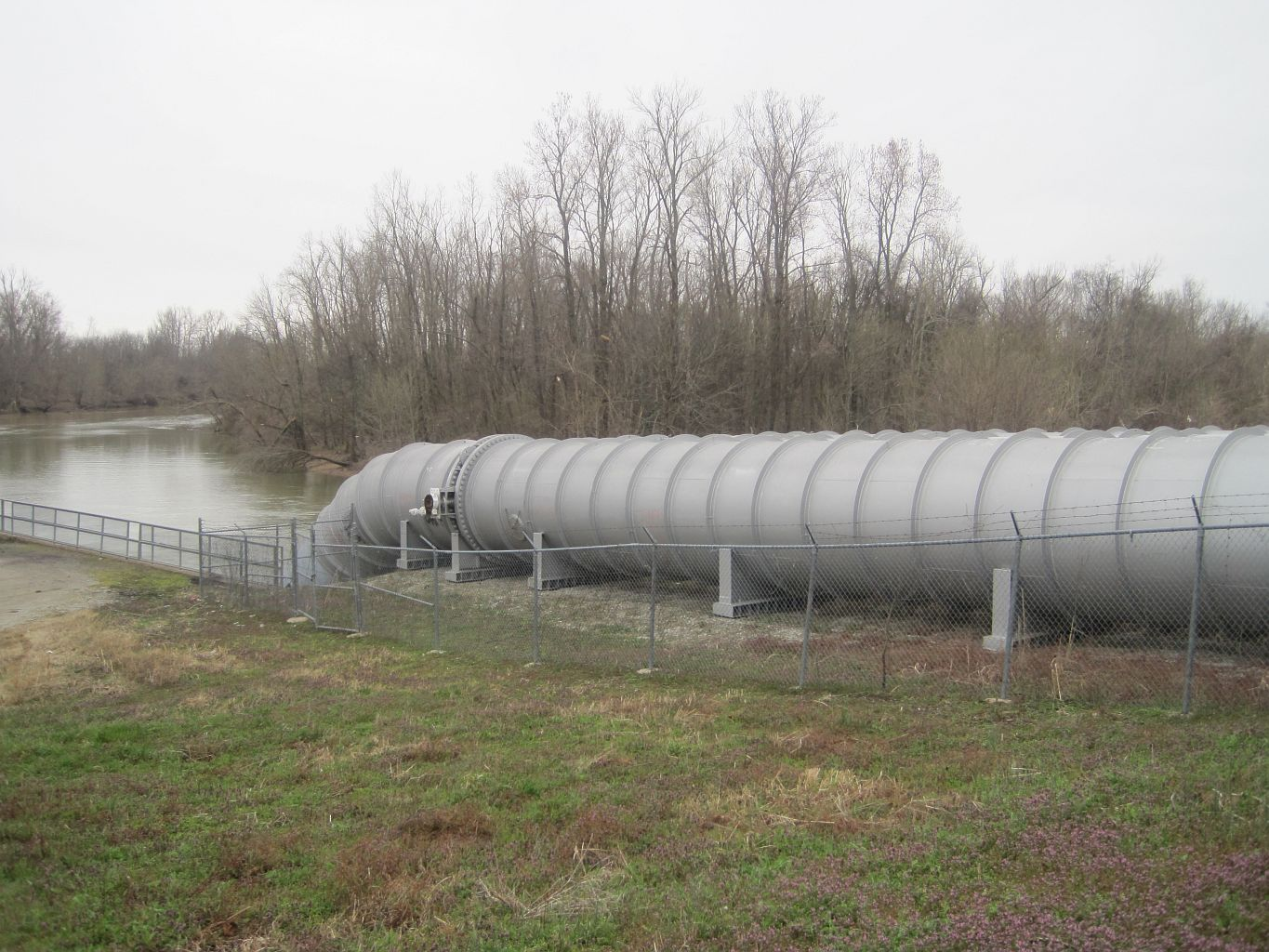
- One of the siphon pipes

- Location within Arkansas Location within the United States
- Nearest city: Marked Tree, Arkansas
- Coordinates: 35°35′13″N 90°26′13″W
- Area: 5.3 acres (2.1 ha)
- Built: 1926
- Built by: US Army Corps of Engineers
- NRHP reference No.: 88000431
- Added to NRHP: May 2, 1988

The Marked Tree Lock and Siphons are a flood control facility on the St. Francis River in Poinsett County, Arkansas. These facilities are located about 2 miles (3.2 km) north of Marked Tree. Built in 1926, the lock is located on a now disused and partially filled artificial channel west of the main river. It has a concrete trough about 130 feet (40 m) long and 30 feet (9.1 m) high, with a small brick control house from which four gates are operated to regulate water flow through the lock. The lock gates have been removed and that area filled in and topped by a roadway. The siphons are located on a levee that impounds the main river channel several hundred feet upstream from the lock, and consist of a series large metal tubes, whose ends are mounted in submerged concrete structures above and below the levee. The siphons were built in 1939 to solve the problem of water flow regulation in the wake of repeated major flooding events on the river, and are described by the United States Army Corps of Engineers as unique in the nation for their scope and efficiency.

The lock and siphons were listed on the National Register of Historic Places in 1988.

== See also ==
- National Register of Historic Places listings in Poinsett County, Arkansas
