= Poinsett Lumber and Manufacturing Company Manager's House =

Historic house in Arkansas, United States

- U.S. National Register of Historic Places
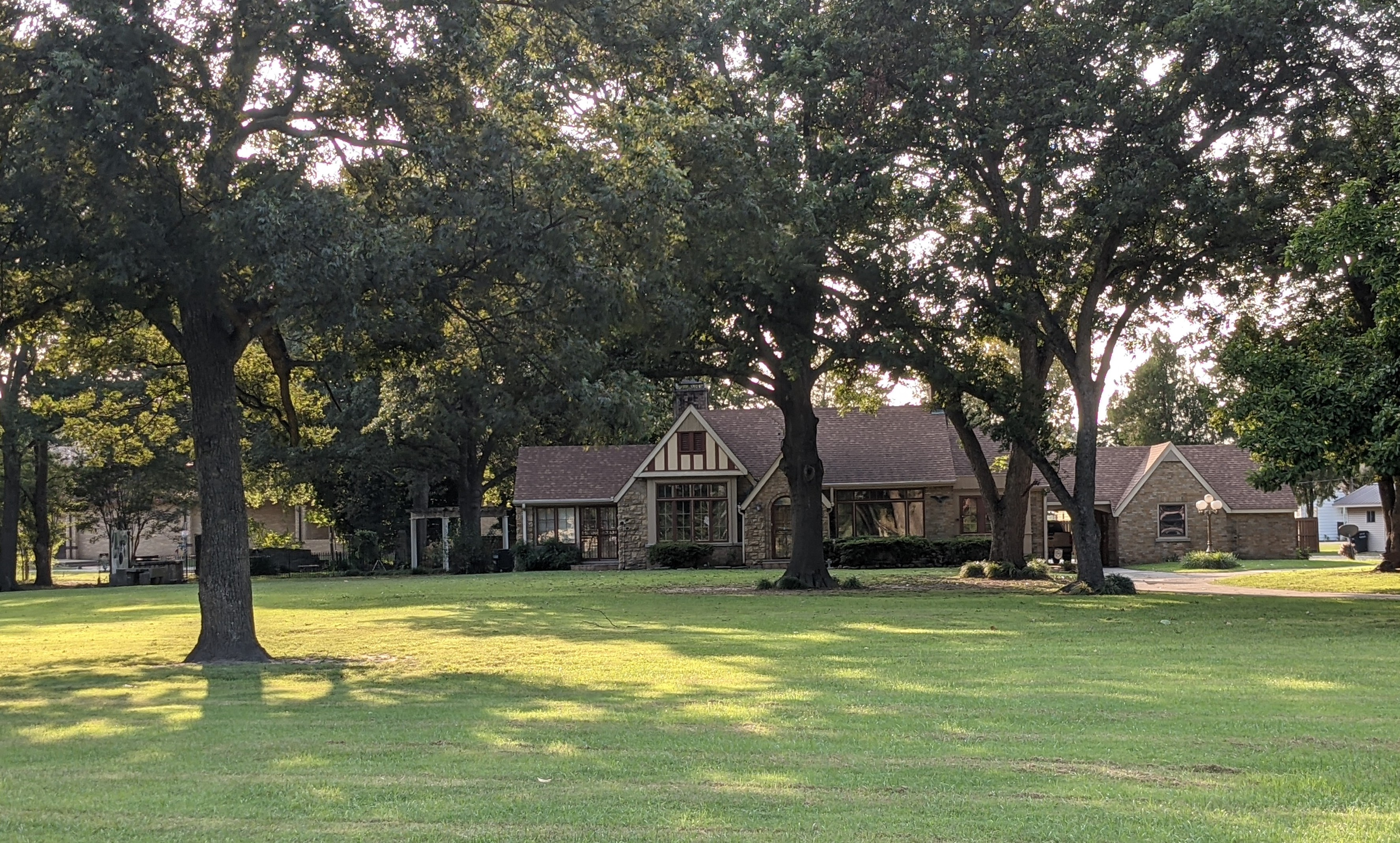

- Location within Arkansas Location within the United States
- Location: 512 Poinsett Ave. Trumann, Arkansas
- Coordinates: 35°40′35″N 90°31′1″W
- Area: 2.8 acres (1.1 ha)
- Built: 1934
- Architect: Edwin B. Phillips
- Architectural style: Tudor Revival
- NRHP reference No.: 09001257
- Added to NRHP: January 21, 2010

The Poinsett Lumber and Manufacturing Company Manager's House, also known locally as the Singer Mansion, is a historic house at 512 Poinsett Avenue in Trumann, Arkansas. It is a single-story structure, with a varied roof line, and multiple exterior sheathing materials, including brick and stucco with false half-timbering typical of the Tudor Revival style, and recently applied modern siding. The house was designed by Edwin B. Phillips and built in 1935 for the Poinsett Lumber Company to house its senior on-site manager. It is, despite the modern siding, the only Tudor Revival building in Trumann, and the only surviving residence associated with the Poinsett Lumber Company, a major area employer in the first half of the 20th century.

The house was listed on the National Register of Historic Places in 2010.

== See also ==
- National Register of Historic Places listings in Poinsett County, Arkansas
