= Liberty Legacy Foundation Award =

The Liberty Legacy Foundation Award is an annual book award given by the Organization of American Historians (OAH). The award goes to the best book written by a professional historian on the fights for civil rights in the United States anytime from 1776 to the present. Dr. Darlene Clark Hine challenged American historians to research and write on those civil rights episodes taking place in the United States before 1954 in her 2002 OAH presidential speech. A committee of three OAH members, chosen by the OAH president, make the selection. As of 2018, the committee chair is Paul Ortiz^{bio}, with both Carol Anderson^{bio} and Charles McKinney^{bio} rounding out the committee. The Award Winner receives a monetary prize that ranges $1000 and $2000. In the Award's first year (2003), a single Winner and six Finalists were named. In 2004, two Winners were named. In 2006 and 2017, one Winner and one Honorable Mention were named for each year. In 2008, one Winner and two Finalists were named.

== List of Award Winners ==
In the table below, the link on the "Author" is to the latest biographical site found. The link on the "Affiliation" is the author's workplace at the time of the award.

Year	Author	Affiliation	Title	Publisher
2003	J. Mills Thornton III^{bio}	University of Michigan	Dividing Lines: Municipal Politics and the Struggle for Civil Rights in Montgomery, Birmingham, and Selma	University of Alabama Press
2004 Co-Winner	Robert Rodgers Korstad^{bio}	Duke University	Civil Rights Unionism: Tobacco Workers and the Struggle for Democracy in the Mid-Twentieth Century South	University of North Carolina Press
2004 Co-Winner	Barbara Ransby	UIC	Ella Baker and the Black Freedom Movement: A Radical Democratic Vision	University of North Carolina Press
2005	Nikhil Pal Singh^{bio}	University of Washington	Black is a Country: Race and the Unfinished Struggle for Democracy	Harvard University Press
2006	Matthew J. Countryman^{bio}	University of Michigan	Up South: Civil Rights and Black Power in Philadelphia	University of Pennsylvania Press
2007	Thomas F. Jackson^{bio}	UNC Greensboro	From Civil Rights to Human Rights: Martin Luther King, Jr. and the Struggle for Economic Justice	University of Pennsylvania Press
2008	Michael Honey^{bio}	University of Washington	Going Down Jericho Road: The Memphis Strike, Martin Luther King's Last Campaign	W. W. Norton & Company
2009	Chris Myers Asch^{bio}	U.S. Public Service Academy	The Senator and the Sharecropper: The Freedom Struggles of James O. Eastland and Fannie Lou Hamer	The New Press
2010	Beryl Satter	Rutgers–Newark	Family Properties: Race, Real Estate, and the Exploitation of Black Urban America	Metropolitan Books
2011	Chad L. Williams	Hamilton College	Torchbearers of Democracy: African American Soldiers in the World War I Era	University of North Carolina Press
2012	Tomiko Brown-Nagin^{bio}	University of Virginia	Courage to Dissent: Atlanta and the Long History of the Civil Rights Movement	Oxford University Press
2013	Andrew W. Kahrl^{bio}	Marquette University	The Land Was Ours: African American Beaches from Jim Crow to the Sunbelt South	Harvard University Press
2014	Susan D. Carle^{bio}	American University	Defining the Struggle: National Organizing for Racial Justice, 1880–1915	Oxford University Press
2015	N. B. D. Connolly^{bio}	Johns Hopkins University	A World More Concrete: Real Estate and the Remaking of Jim Crow South Florida	University of Chicago Press
2016	Tanisha C. Ford	UMass Amherst	Liberated Threads: Black Women, Style, and the Global Politics of Soul	University of North Carolina Press
2017	Russell J. Rickford^{bio}	Cornell University	We Are an African People: Independent Education, Black Power, and the Radical Imagination	Oxford University Press
2018	Ula Yvette Taylor^{bio}	UC Berkeley	The Promise of Patriarchy: Women and the Nation of Islam	University of North Carolina Press

== List of Award Finalists and Honorable Mentions ==
Year	Award Level	Author	Affiliation	Title	Publisher
2003	Finalist	Greta De Jong^{bio}	University of Nevada, Reno	A Different Day: African American Struggles for Justice in Rural Louisiana, 1900-1970	University of North Carolina Press
2003	Finalist	Roxanne Dunbar-Ortiz	independent scholar	Outlaw Woman: A Memoir of the War Years, 1960-1975	City Lights
2003	Finalist	Barbara Mills	Congress of Racial Equality, Baltimore	"Got My Mind Set on Freedom" Maryland's Story of Black and White Activism, 1663-2000	Heritage Books, Inc.
2003	Finalist	Jerald E. Podair^{bio}	Lawrence University	The Strike That Changed New York: Blacks, Whites, and the Ocean Hill-Brownsville Crisis	Yale University Press
2003	Finalist	Mark Robert Schneider	UMass Boston	"We Return Fighting": The Civil Rights Movement in the Jazz Age	Northeastern University Press
2003	Finalist	John D. Skrentny^{bio}	UCSD	The Minority Rights Revolution	Belknap Press
2006	Honorable Mention	Emilye Crosby^{bio}	SUNY Geneseo	A Little Taste of Freedom: The Black Freedom Struggle in Claiborne County, Mississippi	University of North Carolina Press
2008	Finalist	Kent Germany^{bio}	University of South Carolina	New Orleans After the Promises: Poverty, Citizenship and the Search for a Great Society	University of Georgia Press
2008	Finalist	Laurie Green^{bio}	UT Austin	Battling the Plantation Mentality: Memphis and the Black Freedom Struggle	University of North Carolina Press
2017	Honorable Mention	Elizabeth Hinton^{bio}	Harvard University	From the War on Poverty to the War on Crime: The Making of Mass Incarceration in America	Harvard University Press
