= Wabbaseka Methodist Episcopal Church, South =

Historic church in Arkansas, United States

- U.S. National Register of Historic Places
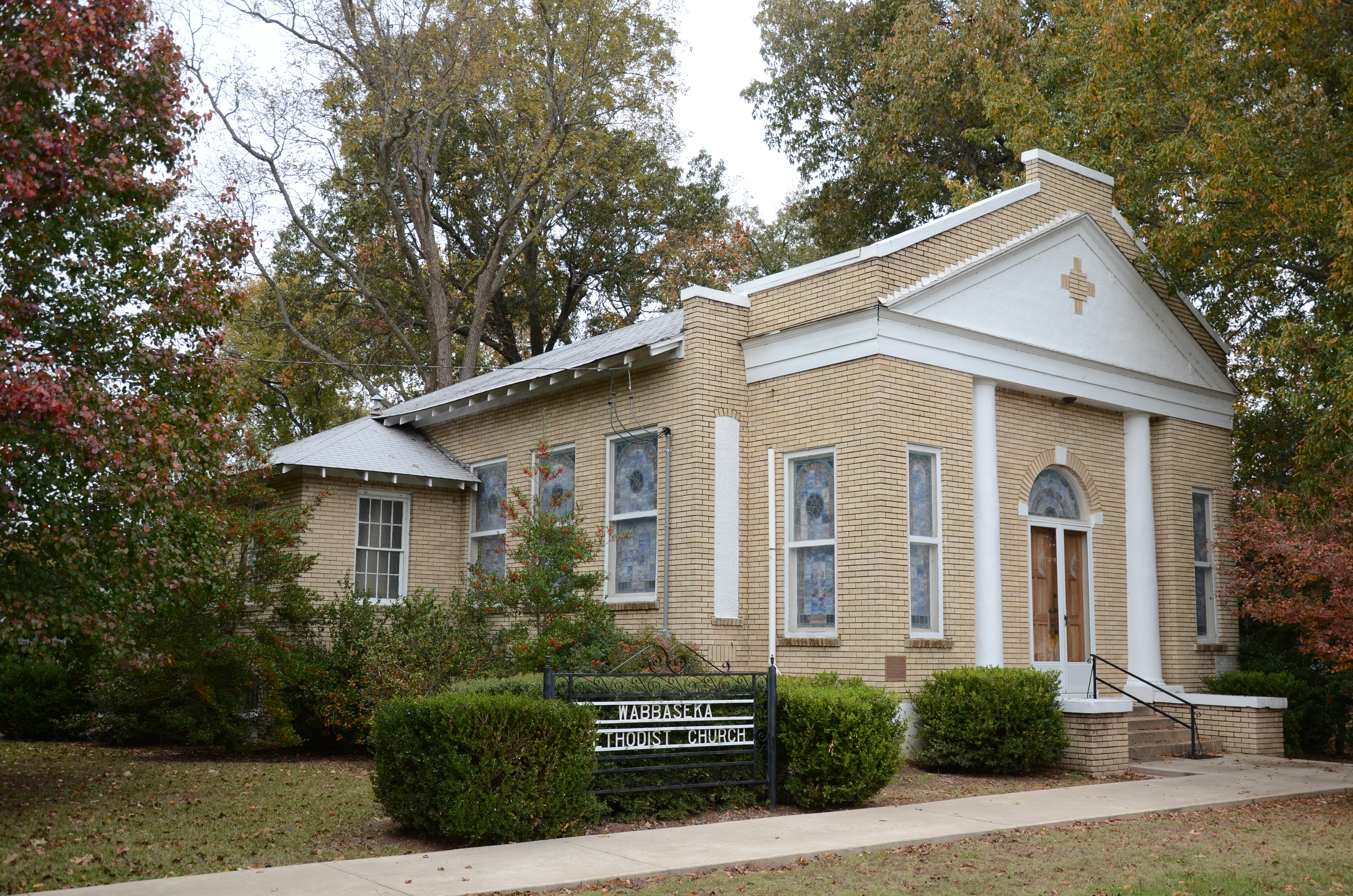

- Location within Arkansas Location within the United States
- Location: US 79, Wabbaseka, Arkansas
- Coordinates: 34°21′36″N 91°47′52″W
- Area: 1 acre (0.40 ha)
- Built: 1925
- Architectural style: Classical Revival
- NRHP reference No.: 02001073
- Added to NRHP: October 4, 2002

Wabbaseka Methodist Episcopal Church, South is a historic church on United States Route 79 in Wabbaseka, Arkansas. It is a single story masonry structure with Classical Revival styling, built in 1925 for a congregation established in 1870. The congregation has since been reunited with the main Methodist organizations, and is now known as the Wabbaseka United Methodist Church. The church is architecturally significant as the only local example of Classical Revival architecture.

The building was listed on the National Register of Historic Places in 2002. The church was closed by the United Methodist Church due to declining attendance in 2017.

== See also ==
- National Register of Historic Places listings in Jefferson County, Arkansas
