= Ward H. Rodgers =

American minister and labor organizer (1910–1996)

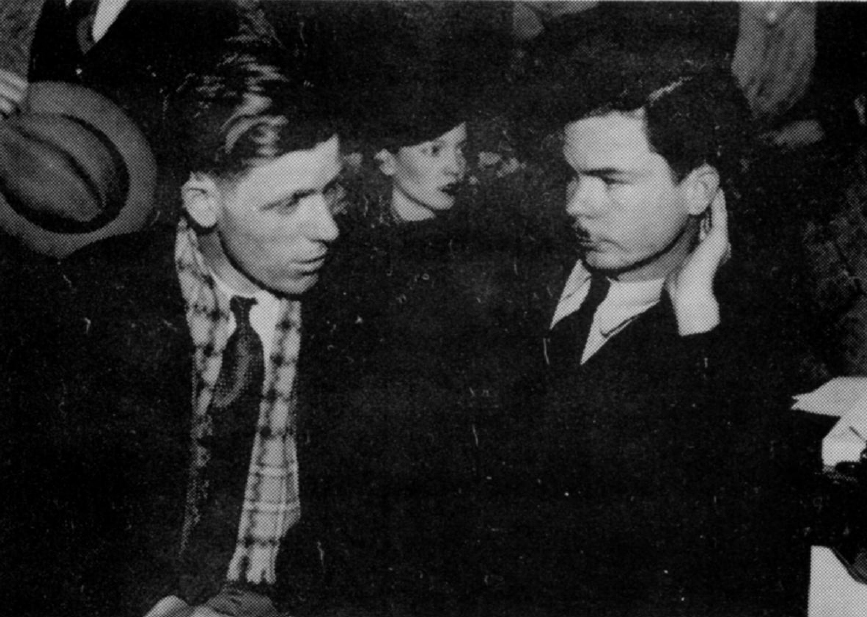
- H. L. Mitchell and Ward H. Rodgers at Rodgers' "anarchy" trial, in Marked Tree, Arkansas, 1935
- Born: October 7, 1910; Texas, US
- Died: June 26, 1996 (aged 85); California, U.S.

Rev. Ward Hotchkiss Rodgers (October 7, 1910 – June 26, 1996) was a Methodist minister and labor activist in the United States. He came to the attention of the public in 1935 when he was arrested in Marked Tree, Arkansas and charged with inciting a riot.

== Biography ==
Ward Rodgers was born in Kountze, Texas on October 7, 1910. He is elsewhere described as a native of Alva, Oklahoma. He had already worked a Methodist minister before he went to study for a divinity degree from Vanderbilt between 1929 and 1932. He ended up in Arkansas where he was affiliated with other radical preachers, one of whom got him a job as an adult school teacher for the Federal Emergency Relief Administration. He also started working as an organizer for the Southern Tenant Farmers' Union, a group opposed to the sharecropping labor system in the Southern United States, and "quickly became one of the most electric speakers and active organizers the STFU would ever have".

In March 1935, as Time magazine explained, "All the elements of a rip-snorting class-conflict were present in the little town of Marked Tree in January when a youngster of 24 named Ward H. Rodgers, on the executive committee of the STFU, addressed an outdoor gathering of hungry, disgruntled and dispossessed tenant farmers. Ward Rodgers, a Socialistic Texan with theological degrees from Vanderbilt and Boston Universities, was already in bad odor with the landlord class because he had been calling Negroes 'mister.' And as an instructor in FERA's adult education service, he had been mixing Karl Marx with the ABC's. He was quoted as saying he was willing, if share croppers were not fed, to 'lynch every plantation owner in Poinsett County.' Clapped into jail, he was speedily brought to trial, convicted of 'anarchy.' He has taken an appeal." The jury convicted him of misdemeanor anarchy, but the "jury was packed with planters—seven of whom had been plantation owners—who were prejudiced against Rodgers. It is likely that the jury would have convicted him regardless of what the evidence against him was." The Ward H. Rodgers Defense Committee was organized to assist him. In March 1936, charges of inciting a riot in Arkansas were dismissed. In April 1936, he was described as a state organizer of the California state Socialist Party and was lecturing in San Diego, California on the "plight of the Southern sharecropper". In May 1936, he sued a member of the LAPD Red Squad for striking him "without provocation" while he was riding in a car with five Mexican strikers during the Venice celery strike.

Rodgers settled in the South Bay region of Los Angeles around 1955 and was a member of a machinists' union. Rodgers was interviewed in 1992 for a documentary about the Great Depression in the United States. He died in Los Angeles, California in 1996.
