= Judd Hill, Arkansas =

- Unincorporated community
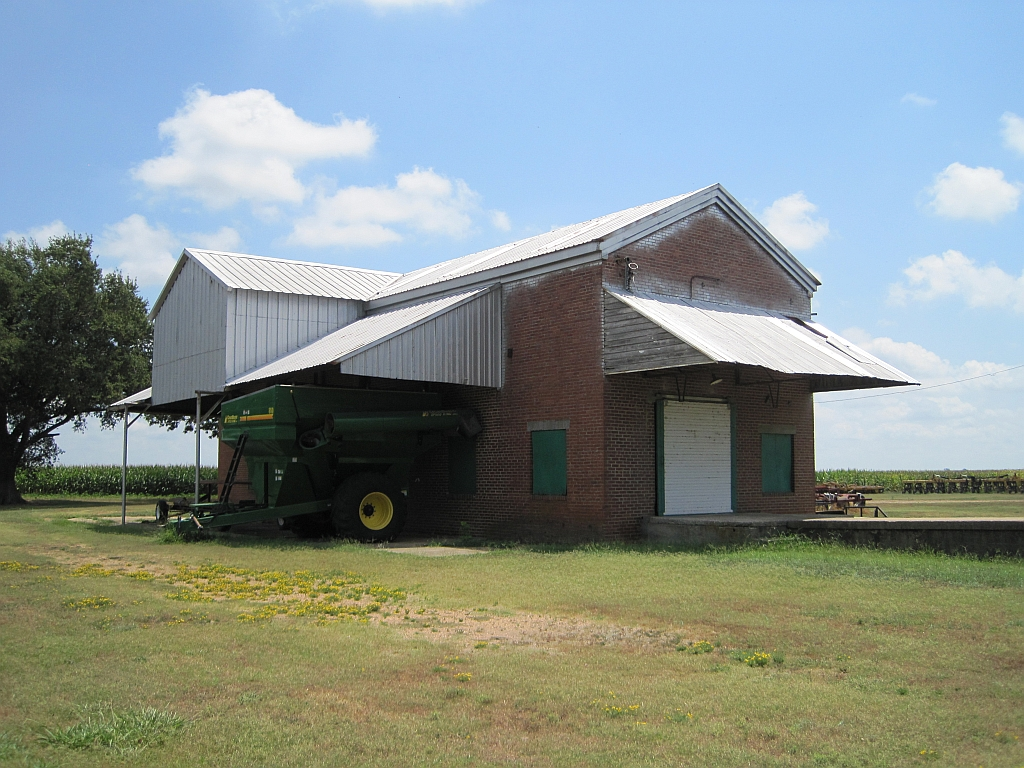
- The Judd Hill Cotton Gin in Judd Hill

- Location within Arkansas Location within the United States
- Coordinates: 35°36′08″N 90°31′09″W
- Country: United States
- State: Arkansas
- County: Poinsett
- Elevation: 217 ft (66 m)
- Time zone: UTC-6 (Central (CST))
  - Summer (DST): UTC-5 (CDT)
- Area code: 870
- GNIS feature ID: 58002

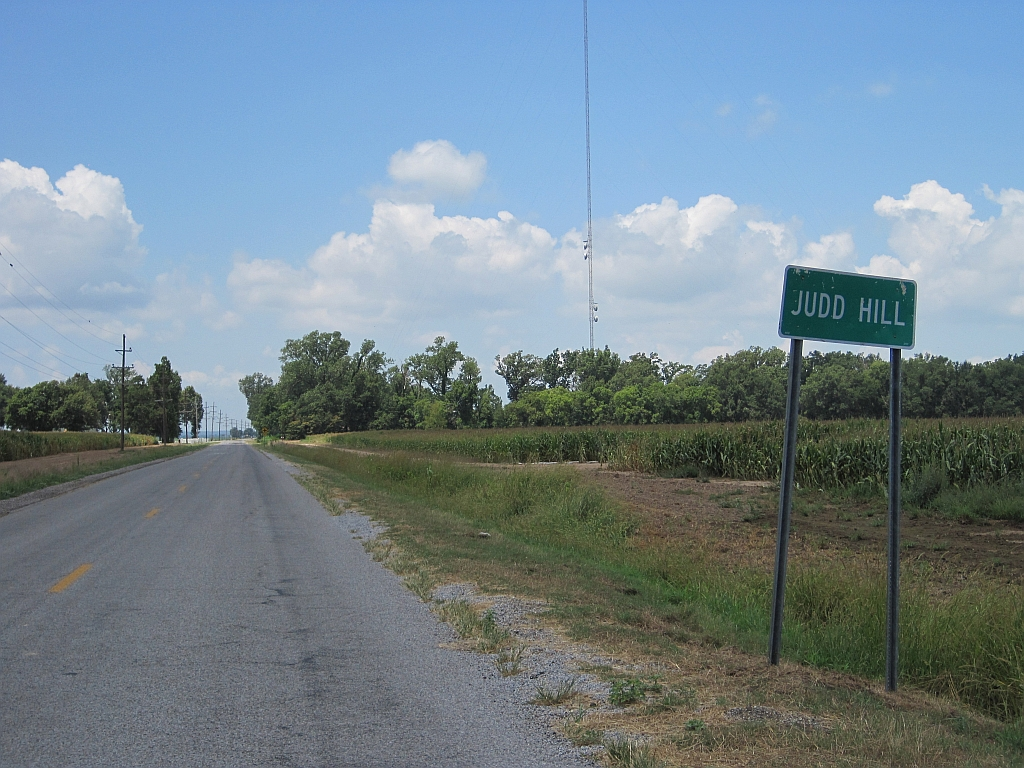
Judd Hill, Arkansas

Judd Hill is an unincorporated community in Poinsett County, Arkansas, United States. Judd Hill is located on Arkansas Highway 214, 5 miles (8.0 km) south of Trumann. The Judd Hill Cotton Gin, which is listed on the National Register of Historic Places, is located in Judd Hill. Judd Hill was named for banker and businessman Orange Judd Hill, who founded the community.
