= Judd Hill Cotton Gin =

- U.S. National Register of Historic Places
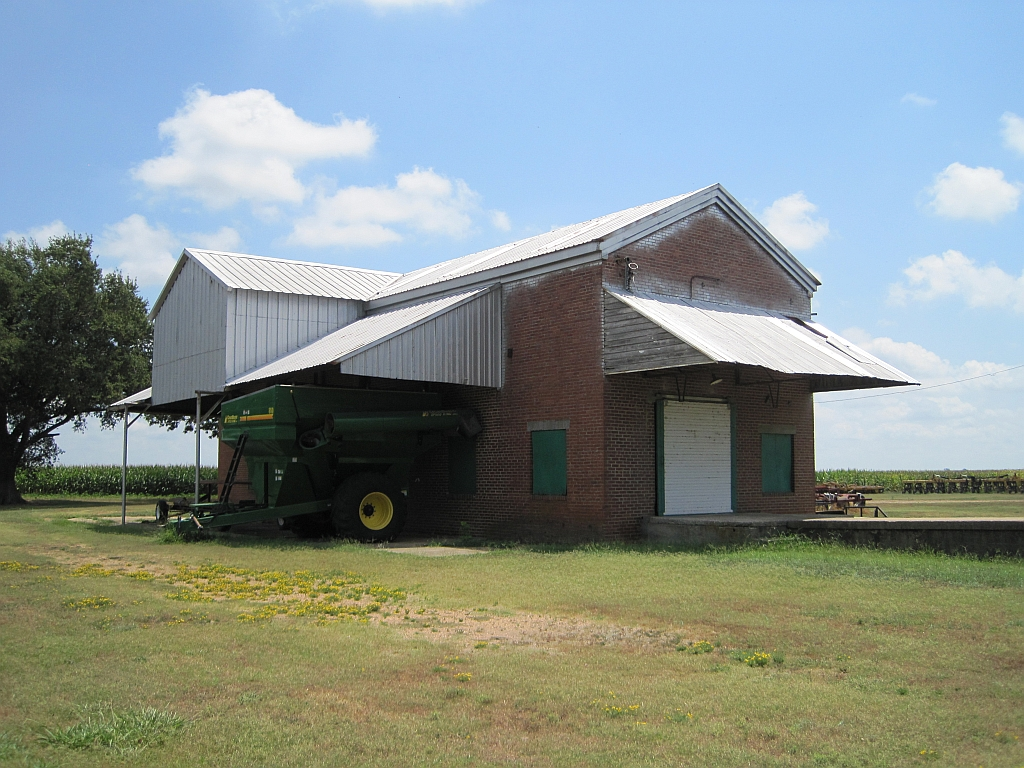

- Location within Arkansas Location within the United States
- Location: AR 214 E of Bridgewood Rd., Judd Hill, Arkansas
- Coordinates: 35°36′12″N 90°31′6″W
- Area: less than one acre
- Built: 1930
- Architectural style: Plain Traditional
- MPS: Cotton and Rice Farm History and Architecture in the Arkansas Delta MPS
- NRHP reference No.: 05001080
- Added to NRHP: September 28, 2005

The Judd Hill Cotton Gin is a historic cotton gin in Judd Hill, Arkansas. The gin was part of the Judd Hill Plantation, which was established by businessman Orange Judd Hill in the 1920s and sold to Hill's daughter and her husband, Esther and Samuel Chapin, in 1933. The cotton gin was built on the plantation circa 1930; its brick construction, designed to prevent fires, makes it a rarity among extant cotton gins. The plantation was successful throughout the 1940s and became one of the largest farms in Poinsett County. The cotton gin ceased operations in the 1970s or 1980s, but the plantation is still operated by the Judd Hill Foundation established by Esther Chapin. On September 28, 2005, the cotton gin was added to the National Register of Historic Places.
