= Rivervale, Arkansas =

- Unincorporated community
- Location within Arkansas Location within the United States
- Coordinates: 35°40′26″N 90°20′24″W
- Country: United States
- State: Arkansas
- County: Sharp
- Elevation: 220 ft (67 m)

Population (2020)
  - Total: 46
- Time zone: UTC-6 (Central (CST))
  - Summer (DST): UTC-5 (CDT)
- GNIS feature ID: 58499

Rivervale is an unincorporated community and census-designated place (CDP) in Poinsett County, Arkansas, United States, approximately five miles north of Lepanto. It was first listed as a CDP in the 2020 census with a population of 46.

The Rivervale Tunnel, an engineering project in which one river flows under another, is located near Rivervale.

Rivervale was the birthplace of brothers Earlie and William H. Fires. Earlie became a Hall of Fame jockey, and William, a racehorse trainer.

== Demographics ==
Historical population
Census	Pop.	Note	%±
2020	46		—
U.S. Decennial Census; 2020

=== 2020 census ===
Rivervale CDP, Arkansas – Demographic Profile (NH = Non-Hispanic) Note: the US Census treats Hispanic/Latino as an ethnic category. This table excludes Latinos from the racial categories and assigns them to a separate category. Hispanics/Latinos may be of any race.
Race / Ethnicity	Pop 2020	% 2020
White alone (NH)	40	86.96%
Black or African American alone (NH)	0	0.00%
Native American or Alaska Native alone (NH)	0	0.00%
Asian alone (NH)	0	0.00%
Pacific Islander alone (NH)	0	0.00%
Some Other Race alone (NH)	0	0.00%
Mixed Race/Multi-Racial (NH)	2	4.35%
Hispanic or Latino (any race)	4	8.70%
Total	46	100.00%
