= National Federation of Colored Farmers =

Cooperative foundation founded in 1922

The National Federation of Colored Farmers (NFCF) was a cooperative foundation founded in 1922 by a group of African-American entrepreneurs and attorneys. Their purpose was to advance efforts to build the capacity of America's Black farmers, by forming local chapters of buying and selling distribution cooperatives. Membership was African American farmers in the south and Midwest. This federation existed until 1949, and was registered in Illinois.

== History of the organization ==
The NFCF wanted to ensure members could be viable and profitable farmers that owned their own land. Their members were primarily landowners, but also tenant farmers that the NFCF helped to buy land. Excluded from membership, due to costs, were often sharecroppers which were the largest portion of African American agricultural workers in the south during this time. The goals of the NFCF were to increase agricultural entrepreneurship profits in African American farmers in the United States by creating local branch cooperatives.

The NFCF assisted farmers with owning and retaining land and brokered steady market access to urban industrial cities' wholesale markets in the Great Lakes, particularly Chicago. This increased member autonomy in selling to a set market. The NFCF also assisted their members by sharing farming tips, political and social issues and other relevant matters via The Modern Farmer.

The NFCF formed local chapters of buying and selling distribution cooperatives. In 1929, the first local NFCF chapter was established in Howard, Mississippi, of about thirty tenant farmers and sharecroppers. The organization's membership expanded across the South after The Modern Farmer was created and was shared. Membership units existed in Alabama, Arkansas, Georgia, Louisiana, southeast Missouri and Tennessee. Most chapters were along the Mississippi and Ohio river valleys; in Mississippi river delta counties, Missouri, Arkansas and Tennessee.

The federation required membership at a cost of $5.00 for a year. That gave members access to a cooperative that would market produce and purchase farm supplies for resale at reduced rates. The NFCF published a newspaper called The Modern Farmer, available with an additional $1 subscription, it was only available to members of the NFCF. Membership in NFCF was primarily land owning farmers due to these costs.

The NFCF had annual conventions that over time were attended by political officials. The ninth annual convention was attended by 4 representatives appointed by governors in Colorado, Oklahoma, Illinois and Iowa.

NFCF was often written about in the Chicago Defender's Farmers' Column. They formed a credit corporation in 1932 to make loans to members.

== Founders ==
The NFCF was founded by four professional African American men that met at the Tuskegee Institute.

- James P. Davis (1876–1962), broker and attorney. President of the NFCF and editor of The Modern Farmer.
- Leon Ray Harris (1886–1960), stationary engineer on Chicago-Rock Island Railroad. Main editor of The Modern Farmer in the 1930s.
- Cornelius R. Richardson (1886–1964), attorney.
- Gilchrist Stewart (1882–1926), attorney.

James P. Davis worked with government officials and extension offices to try and ensure Black farmers received government loans. He was appointed a special field agent by Cully A. Cobb, administrator for the Agricultural Adjustment Administration (AAA) Cotton Section in the lower South, and traveled the lower South relaying complaints to policy makers in Washington, D.C. about Black farmers not receiving loans or information.

== Historical context ==
The NFCF's role in the Black agricultural co-operative movement is very important because African Americans were not allowed into white owned cooperatives so had to make their own. The NFCF was one of the only organizations in existence among African Americans practicing cooperative methods.

The NFCF became a popular organization in the rural south among African American farmers after Universal Negro Improvement Association and African Communities League (UNIA) became less popular with the departure of Marcus Garvey from the U.S.

The NFCF declined as the Depression wore on and the material conditions of African Americans did not improve. The main tenets of land ownership and operating though cooperative schemes did not improve the lives of most of the Black farmers at that time and meetings stopped in 1939. The NFCF was dissolved by the Attorney General in Illinois in 1944 for failure to file an annual report, but their newsletter, The Modern Farmer, remained in publication through January 1949. Many members moved onto Agricultural unions, like the Southern Tenant Farmers Union, that focused more on working class and poor, and/or to the NAACP which focused on pushing the U.S. government for laws to enshrine equality for African Americans.

== Additional resources ==
Correspondence with James P. Davis, President of the NFCF, Cornell University

National Federation of Colored Farmers, correspondence, Harvard University

Correspondence between Minnesota Governor Olson, Floyd B. and the National Federation of Colored Farmers, Minnesota Historical Society

The Modern Farmer newsletter
