= The Modern Farmer =

NFCF monthly publication (1929–1949)

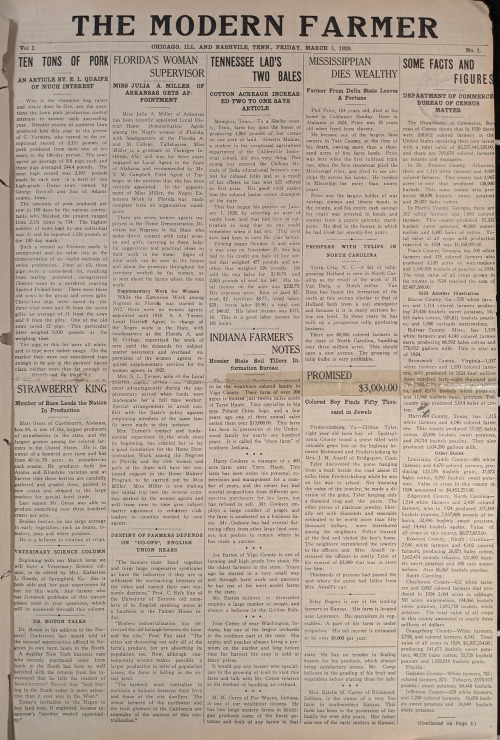
- Founded: 1929
- Ceased publication: 1949
- Language: English
- Country: United States

The Modern Farmer was a national monthly African American publication published in Chicago, Illinois, and Nashville, Tennessee, by the National Federation of Colored Farmers (NFCF). It was published between 1929 and 1949 for African American farmers. The editors were Leon Ray Harris and James P. Davis, the president of the NFCF, Head Field Officer of the Agricultural Adjustment Administration, and a member of President Roosevelt's “Black Cabinet.”

== History ==
=== The National Federation of Colored Farmers (NFCF) ===
The NFCF was founded by four African American men that attended the Tuskegee Institute.

- James P. Davis (1876–1962), broker and attorney
- Leon Ray Harris (1886–1960), stationary engineer on Chicago-Rock Island Railroad – 1930s was the main editor of The Modern Farmer
- Cornelius R. Richardson (1886–1964), attorney
- Gilchrist Stewart (1882–1926), attorney.

The goals of the NFCF were to increase agricultural entrepreneurship profits in African American farmers by creating cooperatives that allowed them to increase African American farmer access to urban industrial cities' wholesale markets in the Great Lakes, particularly Chicago. They also desired to ensure members could be viable and profitable farmers that owned their own land.

The federation required membership at a cost of $5.00 for a year. That gave members access to a cooperative that would market produce and purchase farm supplies for resale at reduced rates. There was an additional $1 subscription for the Modern Farmer, which was only available to members of the NFCF. Membership in NFCF was primarily land owning farmers due to these costs.

The NFCF formed local chapters of buying and selling distribution cooperatives. In 1929, the first local NFCF chapter was established in Howard, Mississippi, of about thirty tenant farmers and sharecroppers. The organization's membership expanded across the South and it began publishing The Modern Farmer. There were initial membership units in Alabama, Arkansas, Georgia, Louisiana, southeast Missouri and Tennessee. Most chapters were along the Mississippi and Ohio river valleys; in Mississippi river delta counties, Missouri, Arkansas and Tennessee. Cooperatives were the method the NFCF used to increase agricultural entrepreneurship profits, cooperatives are organizations owned and run jointly by its members, who share the profits and benefits, so members had a degree of ownership and shares in the sales. In a time of limited markets and little pricing control for Black farmers this was a way to ensure fair pricing for buying and selling goods and more market control.

James P. Davis worked with government officials and extension offices to try and ensure Black farmers received government loans. He was appointed a special field agent by Cully A. Cobb, administrator of the Agricultural Adjustment Administration (AAA) Cotton Section in the lower South, and travelled the lower South relaying complaints to policy makers in Washington, D.C. about Black farmers not receiving loans or information.

The NFCF had annual conventions that over time were attended by political officials. The ninth annual convention was attended by 4 representatives appointed by governors in Colorado, Oklahoma, Illinois and Iowa.

NFCF was often written about in the Chicago Defender's Farmers' Column. They formed a credit corporation in 1932 to make loans to members to ensure they could earn a good living.

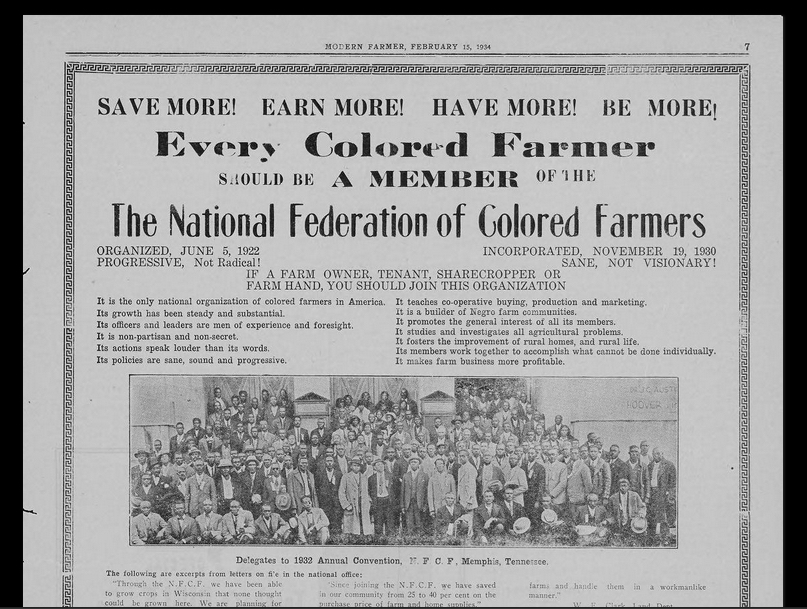
Page of the Modern Farmer

=== The Modern Farmer newspaper ===
The Modern Farmer was the official publication of the NFCF. General topics covered in The Modern Farmer included relevant topics for Black farmers, truck gardeners, livestock and poultry breeders, such as market trends, improving crop yields and agricultural policy. Practices such as owning, managing and directing farms were covered as well as economic interests – short-term financial credit and low rates of interest and standards related to grading and marketing of farm products. The federation worked with the National Baptist Publishing House to produce its newspaper.

The Modern Farmer newspaper, in accordance with the goals of the NFCF, promoted cooperative marketing and purchase schemes of farm supplies, diversified agriculture, and the values of land ownership. Within the pages, similar ideas were mentioned frequently. Later issues of the paper also include a Women's Section.

The goals published in the first issue of the organization's newspaper, The Modern Farmer, emphasized self-help and racial separatism, a philosophy that promoted economic initiative, often linking success with physical isolation in all-black communities and race-conscious businesses that catered to black clientele.

Published stories also included success stories of new cooperatives opening and correspondence with editors of the Chicago Defender.

== Editorial perspective ==
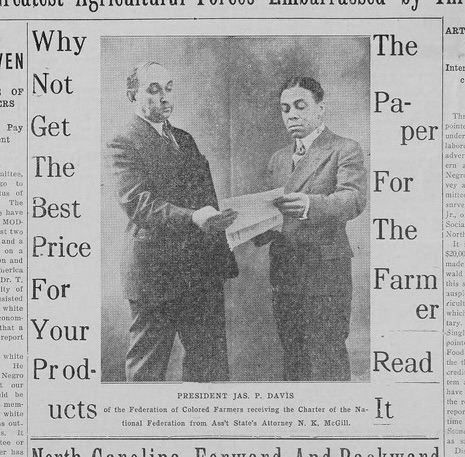
James P. Davis - first editor of the Modern Farmer

Each issue of The Modern Farmer published the NFCF's goals and manifesto which were around collective organizing and strategizing. The newspaper's perspective was that Black farmers should own and control their own co-operative associations, building capital and independence for themselves.

James P. Davis' editorial and the 1932 Presidential Election

In the May 16, 1932 issue, James P. Davis wrote an important editorial reflecting the feelings of the agricultural workers his organization represented. The 1932 United States presidential election represented a sea change. In the years leading up to the election, United States Southern farmers had suffered catastrophic floods, followed by periods of drought. The incumbent, Republican president Hoover, did not provide promised federal relief to farmers and instead told farmers to rely on private help from family, churches and non-profit organizations.

James P. Davis's editorial expressed a deep sense of betrayal, writing that the African American farmers of the South had received little more than expressions of sympathy and no practical relief. Davis called on his readers to shift their votes to the Democrats.

James P. Davis later became a member of Roosevelt's Federal Council of Negro Affairs, also known as the “Black Cabinet,” in part due to his support for Roosevelt during this election. This group included leaders such as Mary McLeod Bethune, educator and political activist, William H. Hastie, an attorney who became the first Black federal judge, and Robert C. Weaver, an attorney who later became a United States Secretary of Housing and Urban Development.
