= Tyronza, Arkansas =

City in Arkansas, United States

- City
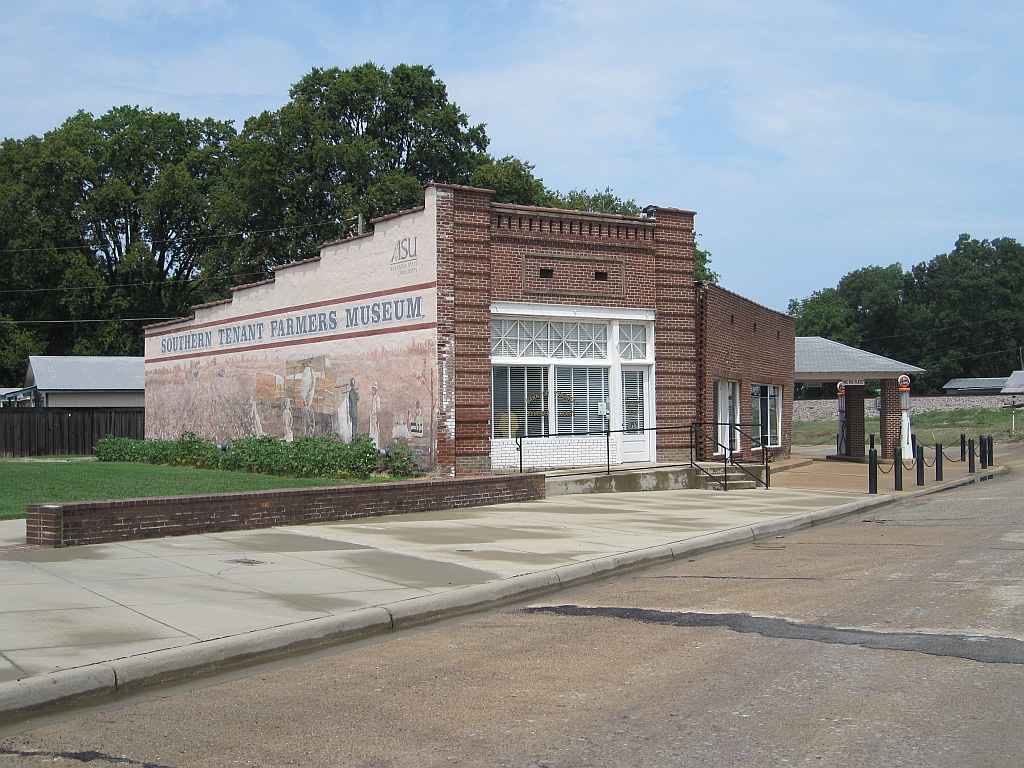
- Southern Tenant Farmers Museum, August 2011

- Flag Logo

- Location of Tyronza in Poinsett County, Arkansas.
- Coordinates: 35°29′12″N 90°21′22″W
- Country: United States
- State: Arkansas
- County: Poinsett
- Incorporated: May 17, 1926

Area
  - Total: 1.56 sq mi (4.03 km^{2})
  - Land: 1.56 sq mi (4.03 km^{2})
  - Water: 0 sq mi (0.00 km^{2})
- Elevation: 217 ft (66 m)

Population (2020)
  - Total: 716
  - Estimate (2025): 721 ▲
  - Density: 460.4/sq mi (177.77/km^{2})
- Time zone: UTC−06:00 (Central (CST))
  - Summer (DST): UTC−05:00 (CDT)
- ZIP Code: 72386
- Area code: 870
- FIPS code: 05-70700
- GNIS feature ID: 2405621
- Website: www.cityoftyronzaar.gov

Tyronza is a city in Poinsett County, Arkansas, United States. The population was 716 at the 2020 census. It is included in the Jonesboro, Arkansas Metropolitan Statistical Area and is in the Arkansas Delta.

== Geography ==
According to the United States Census Bureau, the town has a total area of 4.1 km^{2} (1.6 mi^{2}), all land.

== History ==
Tyronza is one of the oldest cities within Poinsett County with its origins dating back to the late 19th century. In the 1930s, it was the site where the Southern Tenant Farmers Union (STFU) started, and became a national movement against the abusive discrimination by wealthy land owners against the mostly African-American sharecroppers. A museum, located in the original STFU offices and operated by Arkansas State University, highlights the history of organizing by tenant farmers in order to secure better prices and conditions, and the history of the region.

Tyronza was the home of Dr. L. H. McDaniel, a local physician who became friends with President Lyndon Baines Johnson through his political involvement in the Democratic Party. McDaniel was a close advisor to Johnson and to U.S. House Ways and Means Chairman Wilbur D. Mills (D-Arkansas) in the creation of the Medicare and Medicaid programs which began in 1965, the year McDaniel died. He treated patients all over eastern Arkansas regardless of their ability to pay and often accepted live chickens, baked goods and garden vegetables as payment for his home visits. McDaniel was a national delegate to Democratic Conventions in the 1950s and brought national political and medical leaders to Tyronza with conferences he set up in huge 1,000-seat tents on the outskirts of the city.

Although the community started as a county farming and retail center, it has become a bedroom community for its many residents who work in Jonesboro or Memphis but who prefer the small town lifestyle.

=== Socialism ===
Tyronza was historically a hotbed for socialism and communism during the early 20th century.

The Southern Tenant Farmers Union (STFU) was formed by local socialists H. L. Mitchell and H. Clay East to organize local sharecroppers towards getting better arrangements from landowners. Additionally, the STFU collaborated and organized with the Socialist Party.

Ward H. Rogers, a Texas-born minister and labor activist, threatened to hang every plantation owner in Poinsett County, Arkansas if the demands of the sharecroppers were not met.

== Demographics ==
Historical population
Census	Pop.	Note	%±
1930	573		—
1940	639		11.5%
1950	656		2.7%
1960	601		−8.4%
1970	510		−15.1%
1980	777		52.4%
1990	858		10.4%
2000	918		7.0%
2010	762		−17.0%
2020	716		−6.0%
2025 (est.)	721	▲	0.7%
U.S. Decennial Census

=== 2020 census ===
Tyronza racial composition
Race	Number	Percentage
White (non-Hispanic)	615	85.89%
Black or African American (non-Hispanic)	28	3.91%
Asian	1	0.14%
Other/Mixed	45	6.28%
Hispanic or Latino	27	3.77%

As of the 2020 United States census, there were 716 people, 376 households, and 268 families residing in the city.

=== 2000 census ===
At the 2000 census, of 2000, there were 918 people, 363 households and 257 families residing in the town. The population density was 225.8/km^{2} (586.5/mi^{2}). There were 388 housing units at an average density of 95.4/km^{2} (247.9/mi^{2}). The racial makeup of the town was 94.12% White, 3.70% Black or African American, 0.54% from other races, and 1.63% from two or more races. 0.65% of the population were Hispanic or Latino of any race.

There were 363 households, of which 34.7% had children under the age of 18 living with them, 54.5% were married couples living together, 12.1% had a female householder with no husband present, and 29.2% were non-families. 26.7% of all households were made up of individuals, and 12.7% had someone living alone who was 65 years of age or older. The average household size was 2.53 and the average family size was 3.09.

26.1% of the population were under the age of 18, 12.1% from 18 to 24, 25.6% from 25 to 44, 24.7% from 45 to 64, and 11.4% who were 65 years of age or older. The median age was 35 years. For every 100 females, there were 100.0 males. For every 100 females age 18 and over, there were 96.0 males.

The median household income was $30,188 and the median family income was $34,333. Males had a median income of $30,820 and females $20,625. The per capita income was $12,984. About 17.2% of families and 21.6% of the population were below the poverty line, including 29.3% of those under age 18 and 24.0% of those age 65 or over.

== Education ==
The East Poinsett County School District operates public schools, including East Poinsett County High School.

The Tyronza School District consolidated into the East Poinsett district on July 1, 1986.

== Notable people ==
- Mignon Dunn, opera singer
